This is a list of play-by-mail (PBM) games. It includes games played only by postal mail, those played by mail with a play-by-email (PBEM) option, and games played in a turn-based format only by email or other digital format.

It is unclear what the earliest play-by mail game is between chess and Go. Diplomacy was first played by mail in 1963. In the early 1970s, in the United States, Rick Loomis of Flying Buffalo Inc, began a number of play-by-mail games; this included games such as Nuclear Destruction (1970). This marked the beginning of the professional PBM industry. Other publishers followed suit, with significant expansion across the industry in the 1980s. This supported the publication of a number of newsletters from individual play-by-mail companies as well as independent publications such as Gaming Universal, Paper Mayhem, and Flagship which focused solely on the play-by-mail gaming industry. The sourcing of play-by-mail games in this list largely comes from these magazines, whether from reviews or advertisements, as well as additional magazines such as Space Gamer/Fantasy Gamer, Dragon Magazine, and other publications that serviced the gaming community broadly, resuming with the contemporary online magazine Suspense and Decision, which supports the small but active play-by-mail gaming community today.

In some cases, more than one publisher can be found for the same game on the list. This is because the rights to play-by-mail games were occasionally sold among publishers. In other cases, a publishing company might license a game to another company—which could even translate and moderate the game in a different country. Many more play-by-mail games existed in nascent, playtest form than there are on this list. Only games which completed playtesting and were released for play are included here as a "published" game. This list includes games which are no longer available for play as well as games that are still active. Game durations range from those which were only briefly available for play, such as Quest of Gorr, to those which have been played for decades or longer, such as Alamaze, Diplomacy, Hyborian War,  and Chess.

Active play-by-mail games

Inactive U.S. play-by-mail games 

{| class="wikitable sortable"
|+List
! scope="col" | Game
! scope="col" | Released 
! scope="col" | Publisher
! scope="col" | Associate(s)
! scope="col" class="unsortable" | Ref
|-
! scope="row" | 1483 Online
|
|Guild of Blades
|
|
|-
! scope="row" | 1776
|
| 
|David Kohls
|
|-
! scope="row" | 1939 World Wide Battleplan
|
|Flying Buffalo Inc
|
|
|-
! scope="row" | 2 Halves
|
| Nova Games
|
| 
|-
! scope="row" | 2300 A.D. – The Great Game
|
| 
| 
|
|-
! scope="row" | 24 The RPG
|
| 
| 
|
|-
! scope="row" | 2nd Ed AD&D game: Sacred Scolls campaign
|
| 1980s
| 
|
|-
! scope="row" | 5th Tier
| 
| DFS Productions
|
|
|-
! scope="row" | A Bledian Diary
|
|Spellbinder Games
|
|
|-
! scope="row" | A&D Soccer
|
|A&D Entertainment
|
|
|-
! scope="row" | Absolute Fantasy
|
|Silver Dreamer
|
|
|-
! scope="row" | Absolute Power
| 
|  
|  
|
|-
! scope="row" | Absolute Power II
|
|Silver Dreamer
|
|
|-
! scope="row" | Absolute Heroes
|
|Jade Enterprises
|
|
|-
! scope="row" | Abyss
| 
| Zephyr Enterprises, Inc.
|
|
|-
! scope="row" | A Call to Duty
| 
|  
|
|
|-
! scope="row" | A Duel of a Different Color
|
|Fractal Dimensions
|
|
|-
! scope="row" | Advanced Squad Leader
| 
|  
|  
|
|-
! scope="row" | Ad Astra
|
|Superior Simulations
|
|
|-
! scope="row" | Advanced Dungeons & Dragons
|
|ECI
|
|
|-
! scope="row" | Adventurers Guild
|
|Entertainment Plus More Games
|
|
|-
! scope="row" | Adventures in Parlan
| 
| DeMark Enterprises
|
| 
|-
! scope="row" | Aeolian Harp
| 
| The Talisman
|
| 
|-
! scope="row" | Aegyptus
|1984
|World Campaigns
|
|
|-
! scope="row" | Aeroball
|
|Mark Wightman
|
|
|-
! scope="row" | AEs
| 
| Legends
|
| 
|-
! scope="row" | A Frontier Explained
| 
|  
|Sam Hoobler
|
|-
! scope="row" | Aftermath 2150
| 
| Centurion Game Company
|
| 
|-
! scope="row" | The Afterworld
|
|Sci Fi Simulations
|
|
|-
! scope="row" | Against All Odds (AAO)
| 
| C2 Simulations
|
| 
|-
! scope="row" | Agamemnon
| 
| Kelem Games
|
| 
|-
! scope="row" | Agamemnon II
| 
| Kelem Games
|
| 
|-
! scope="row" | Age of Discovery
| 
| E-Mail Games
|
| 
|-
! scope="row" | Age of Imperialism
| 
| Allen Kimball
|
| 
|-
! scope="row" | Age of Gold
| 
| Nevanis Games
|
| 
|-
! scope="row" | Age of Heroes
|
|
|
| 
|-
! scope="row" | Agora Nomic
|Started June 1993
| 
| 
| 
|-
! scope="row" | A Hell of a Ride
| 
|  
|Cordelia Chase
|
|-
! scope="row" | Alien Conflict
|1983
|Schubel & Son
|
|
|-
! scope="row" | Alien Conquest
|
|Redgod Enterprises
|
|
|-
! scope="row" | Alien Destiny
| 
| AMM Enterprises
|
|  
|-
! scope="row" | Alien Empires
|
|Horizon Games
|
|
|-
! scope="row" | Alien Invasion
| 
| Schubel & Son
|
|  
|-
! scope="row" | Alphabet City
|Circa 2000s
| 
| 
| 
|-
! scope="row" | Alphasim Hocket Simulation (formerly World Electronic Hockey League)
|Circa 2000s
| 
| 
| 
|-
! scope="row" | Amaranth
| 
| Harlequin Games
|
| 
|-
! scope="row" | American Civil War Battles
|
|
|
|
|-
! scope="row" | American War of Independence Battles
|
|
|
|
|-
! scope="row" | A National Will
|
|Simcoarum Systems
|
|
|-
! scope="row"  | Ancient Campaigns
|
|Viking Games
|
|
|-
! scope="row"  | Ancient Empires
|
|Patrick Price, Schubel & Son, licensed to Walters Associates of Mississippi.
|
| 
|-
! scope="row"  | Android Arena
|
|Adventure Simulation Games
|
|
|-
! scope="row"  | The Andromeda Cluster
|
|Micro Software Design
|
| 
|-
! scope="row" | A New World
| 
|  
| 
|
|-
! scope="row"  | Angrelmar: The Court of Kings
| 1981
| Ray Estabrook
| Ray Estabrook (Designer and Publisher)
| 
|-
! scope="row"  | Antagony
|
|Jester Games & Hobbies
|
|
|-
! scope="row" | A Paladin in Hell ... and Beyond
| 
|  
| 
|
|-
! scope="row" | Apocalypse: Survival After Armageddon
|
| Eckert Gaming Group
|
|
|-
! scope="row" | The Apoch
| 
|Spellbinder II
|
|
|-
! scope="row" | Arcane Challenge
|
| Simulation Technologies
|
|
|-
! scope="row"  | Archella
|
|Leisure Time Unlimited
|
|
|-
! scope="row"  | Archmage
|
|Shadow Island Games
|
|
|-
! scope="row" | Arden
|
| Arden Enterprises
|
|
|-
! scope="row"  | Arena
|
|Shadow Island Games
|
|
|-
! scope="row" | Arena Combat
| 
| Schubel & Son
|Duane Wilcoxson (Designer)
| 
|-
! scope="row" | Arena of Doom RPG PbA  
|Circa 2010s
| 
| 
| 
|-
! scope="row"  | Armed Forces Commander
|
|Anarchy by Mail
|
|
|-
! scope="row"  | Armageddon – The Last War
|
|Rick Barr
|
|
|-
! scope="row"  | Armageddon's Aftermath
|
|Damien Games
|
|
|-
! scope="row" | Armorclads
|August 1991
|DVS Productions
|
|
|-
! scope="row" | Arms & Alliances
|  
| Arms & Alliances
|
| 
|-
! scope="row" | Artemis Fowl- The Battle Begins  
|Circa 2010s
| 
| 
| 
|-
! scope="row" | Ascension to Empire
|
|Maverick Games
|
|
|-
! scope="row" data-sort-value="Ashes of Empire" | The Ashes of Empire
|
|
|
|
|-
! scope="row" | Aspects of Might
|
|Silver Dreamer
|
|
|-
! scope="row" data-sort-value="Assassin's Quest" | The Assassin's Quest
|1980
|De Jager & Co
|
| 
|-
! scope="row" | A Stitch in Time
|
|Huscarl Hobbies
|
|
|-
! scope="row" | Atlantic Conflict
|
|Advent Games
|
|
|-
! scope="row" | Atlantean Realm
|
|
|
|
|-
! scope="row" | Atlantis
|
|Juan Varein
|
|
|-
! scope="row" | Atlantis 3.0
| 1996
| Merry Prankster Games
|Geoff Dunbar
|
|-
! scope="row" | Atlantrix
|1988 or earlier
| Battle-Magic Gaming
|Mike Mayeau
|
|-
! scope="row" | Austerlitz
|
|Quirxel Games
|
|
|-
! scope="row" | Austerlitz
|
|Supersonic Games
|
|
|-
! scope="row" | Autoduel
|  
| Prometheus Games
|
|  
|-
! scope="row" | Banana Republic
|
| Head Games
|
| 
|-
! scope="row" | Barony of the Rivers
|
|Adam Hill
|
|
|-
! scope="row" | Baroque
|
| The Game Anvil
|
| 
|-
! scope="row" | Baseball Fan-tastic
| 
|Baseball Fan-tastic
|
|  
|-
! scope="row" | Battle Cry: Lord Series
|
| Post Age Games
|
|
|-
! scope="row" | Battlefield Europe
| 
| 
|
|  
|-
! scope="row" | Battleground
|
| 
|
| 
|-
! scope="row" | Battle of the Planets
|
|GAD Games
|
|
|-
! scope="row" | Battle Lords
|
| Creative Keys
|
|
|-
! scope="row" | Battle of Gettysburg
|
| Norman Conquest Games
|
|
|-
! scope="row" | Battle of Midway
|
| Norman Conquest Games
|
| 
|-
! scope="row" | Battle of the Gods
|
| Integral Games
|
| 
|-
! scope="row" | Battle Metal
|
| Shrewd Expanse
|
|
|-
! scope="row" | Battle Robots
|
|Galactic Society Four
|
|
|-
! scope="row" | BattleTech Mercenaries  
|Circa 2010s
| 
| 
| 
|-
! scope="row" | Beer Mogul
|
|Red Mohawk
|
|
|-
! scope="row" | Belter
|
| Classified Information
|
|
|-
! scope="row" | Beyond the Quadra Zone
|
| Quest Games Inc
|
| 
|-
! scope="row"  | Beyond the Sea of Venom
|
|Jester Games & Hobbies
|
|
|-
! scope="row" | Beyond the Stellar Empire
|
| Adventures By Mail
|
|
|-
! scope="row" | Beyond the Stellar Empire: The New System
|
| Adventures By Mail
|
|
|-
! scope="row" | Big League Franchise Owner
| 
| Horizon International, Inc.
|
| 
|-
! scope="row" | Black Ice
| Started and ended in ~1997 (short-lived)
| Horizon Games
|
| 
|-
! scope="row" | Bladequest
| 
| Horizon International, Inc.
|
| 
|-
! scope="row" | Blasted Earth
|
| Precedence
|
|
|-
! scope="row" | Bliss
|
| R3
|
|
|-
! scope="row" | Blitzkrieg
| 
| Phildee Enterprises
|
|
|-
! scope="row" | Blood Pit
| 
| Emprise Game Systems
|
| 
|-
! scope="row" | Blood, Guts & Gore Across the Galaxy
| 
| Deltax Gaming
|
| 
|-
! scope="row" | Bloody Blade
|
| Damien Games
|
|
|-
! scope="row" | Board of Directors
| 
| Flying Buffalo, Inc.
|
| 
|-
! scope="row" | Bones Castle
| 
| M.T. Lunsford, moderated in D2 Report
|
| 
|-
! scope="row" | Borderlands: Federation and Empire  
|1993 to 2010s
| 
| 
| 
|-
! scope="row" | The Borderlands of Khataj
| 
| Mailed Gauntlets
|
| 
|-
! scope="row" | Bounty Hunter
|
| Creative Management Services
|
|
|-
! scope="row" | Boys of Summer
|
| Blue Panther Enterprises
|
|
|-
! scope="row" | British Wrestling Association
|
|Daniel Turner
|
|
|-
! scope="row" | Bron
| 1984
| Otto Schmidt II
| 
|
|-
! scope="row" | Buck Rogers: Conquest of the 25th Century
| 1990
| TSR
| Design: Bruce Nesmith 
|
|-
! scope="row" | Button Men Web Game
|
| Cheapass Games
|
|
|-
! scope="row" | C++ Robots  
|1990s
| 
| 
| 
|-
! scope="row" | Capitol
|1983
| Adventures by Mail
|
|
|-
! scope="row"  | Captains of the Empire
|
|Interface Software
|
|
|-
! scope="row"  | Captain's War
|
|Norman Conquest War
|
|
|-
! scope="row" | Caravans of Pan Geos
|Early 1984
| Galactic Empires
|Daniel Pierce (Gamemaster)
|
|-
! scope="row" | Cartel
|
|Diverse Talents, Inc.
|
|
|-
! scope="row" | Castle War
|1986
|Mialdian Press
|
|
|-
! scope="row" | Catacombs of Chaos
|
| Schubel & Son
|Duane Wilcoxson (Designer)
|
|-
! scope="row" | Celestrek II
| 
| Clemens & Associates, Inc.
|
| 
|-
! scope="row" | Celevor
| 
| Steven Chabotte
|
| 
|-
! scope="row" | The Centre Cannot Hold
| 
| Undying King Games
|
| 
|-
! scope="row" | Centre-Earth
|
|Giles Bartram
|
|
|-
! scope="row" | Centurion
| 
| Fantasy Workshop
|
|
|-
! scope="row" | Championship Football
|
|Hemsoft Computer Consultants
|
|
|-
! scope="row" | Chaos Trail
|
|Simon Williams
|
|
|-
! scope="row" | Championship League
|
|Supersonic Games
|
|
|-
! scope="row" | Charioteers
| 1989
| Daurada Games
|
| 
|-
! scope="row"  | The Chevian Chronicles
|
|Shadow Island Games
|
|
|-
! scope="row" | Chicken Run
|
|Received Wisdom
|
|
|-
! scope="row" | Children/Morning Star
|
| 
|
| 
|-
! scope="row" | Civil War
| 
| Third Wave Simulations
|
| 
|-
! scope="row" | Civil War in the Exiled Nations
| 
| Tom Webster
|
| 
|-
! scope="row" | City of Milanas
| 
| Jagg Productions
|1997
| 
|-
! scope="row" | City State
| 
| Sigma Games
|
| 
|-
! scope="row" | The Clans of Trove
| 
| Yellowseed Games
|
| 
|-
! scope="row" | Clans II
|
|Hightreet Internet Ltd
|
|
|-

! scope="row" | Clansmen
| 
| Parlos Games
| Mark Palin
|
|-

! scope="row" | Clovenshield
|
|Clovenshield
|
|
|-
! scope="row" | Cluster
| 
| Capitol Consulting//VRL, Inc.
|Robert Hayes (creator)
| 
|-
! scope="row" | Cluster Lords
|
|Palace Simulations
|
| 
|-
! scope="row" | Cluster Wars
|
| 
|
| 
|-
! scope="row" | Coliseum
|  
| Sovereign Games
|
| 
|-
! scope="row" | The Colonies
|  
| The Colonies
|
| 
|-
! scope="row" | Combat
|
| Dynamic Games
|
| 
|-
! scope="row" | Company Commander Campaign
|  
| Tom Webster
|
|  
|-
! scope="row" | Computer Boxing
|
| Schubel & Son 
|
| 
|-
! scope="row" | Computer Sports Connoisseurs
| 
|Computer Sports Connoisseurs
|
| 
|-
! scope="row" | Conclave
|
| Undying King Games
|
| 
|-
! scope="row" | Conflict 2000
|
| Sinbad's Games
|
| 
|-
! scope="row" | Conquest
|1989
| Earnshaw Enterprises
|
| 
|-
! scope="row" | Conquest of the 25th Century
| 
| TSR, Inc.
|
| 
|-
! scope="row" | Conquest of the Stars
| 1986
| Schubel & Son
|
| 
|-
! scope="row" | Conquest of Insula II
| 
| Clemens & Associates
|
| 
|-
! scope="row" | Conquest of Parlan
| 
| DeMark Enterprises
|
| 
|-
! scope="row" | Conquest & Crusades
| 
| Damien Games
| 
| 
|-
! scope="row" | Conquest & Destiny
| 
| 
| 
| 
|-
! scope="row" | Conquest by Millions
|
| Scott Bowyer
|
| 
|-
! scope="row" | Continental Rails
| 
| Graaf Simulations
|
| 
|-
! scope="row" | Continental Conquest
| 
| Agents of Gaming
|
| 
|-
! scope="row" | Continuum
| 
|Zephyr Enterprises Inc, MBT Games
|Edward Baily (Moderator, MBT Games)
| 
|-
! scope="row" | Corporation
| 
| Undying King Games
|
| 
|-
! scope="row" | Chess
| data-sort-value="500" | c. 6th century
|
|
| 
|-
! scope="row" | Cosa Nostra
| 
| Yellowseed Games
|
| 
|-
! scope="row" | Cosmic Crusaders
| 
| Genesis Games Design
|
| 
|-
! scope="row" | Cosmic Dominion
| 
| Galactic Simulations
|
| 
|-
! scope="row" | Coup d'état
| 
| Sinbad's Games
|
| 
|-
! scope="row" | Counter-Terrorist
|
| Eckert Gaming Group
|
|
|-
! scope="row" | Court of Kings
|
| The Round Table
|
| 
|-
! scope="row" | Covert Operations
|
| Flying Buffalo Inc
|
| 
|-
! scope="row" | Crack of Doom
| 
| Advanced Gaming Enterprises
|Duane Wilconxson and Debbie Leonard
| 
|-
! scope="row" | Crack of Doom II
| 
| Advanced Gaming Enterprises
|Duane Wilconxson and Debbie Leonard
| 
|-
! scope="row" | Crastini Venient  
|2015
| 
| 
| 
|-
! scope="row" | Crater War
| 
| Jabberwock Enterprises
|
| 
|-
! scope="row" | Cricket Manager
| 
| Jeff Perkins
|
| 
|-
! scope="row" | Crime Lords
| 1981
| Gamers Unlimited
|
| 
|-
! scope="row"  | Crisis (CRISIS)
|
|Rick Barr
|
|
|-
! scope="row" | Crisis in the West
| 
| 
|
|
|-
! scope="row" | Crownless Earth
|
| KRS Fantasy Worlds
|
|
|-
! scope="row" | Crusade
| 
| Ed Bailey
|
|  
|-
! scope="row" | Crystal Island
| 
| Saul Betesh
|
| 
|-
! scope="row" | CSC Fantasy Baseball
| 
| Computer Sports Connoisseurs
|
|  
|-
! scope="row" | CTF 2187
| 
| Advanced Gaming Enterprises
|
| 
|-
! scope="row"  | Crusade
|
|Schubel & Son, licensed to Walters Associates of Mississippi.
|
|
|-
! scope="row" | CWA Wrestling
| 
| KTH
|
| 
|-
! scope="row" | Cyberfringe
| 
| Marguerite Dias
|
| 
|-
! scope="row" | Cyber-Toons
| 1997
| Rebel Games
|
| 
|-
! scope="row" | Cyborg
| 1981
| Integral Games
|
| 
|-
! scope="row" | Dark Age
| 
| HCS Games
| 
| 
|-
! scope="row" | Dark Blades
| 
| Adventure Simulation Games
| 
| 
|-
! scope="row" | Dark Magus
| 
| Dark Magus Productions
| 
| 
|-
! scope="row" | Dark Horizons X-Men RPG  
|2000s
| 
| 
| 
|-
! scope="row" | Dark Marauders RPG  
|2010s
| 
| 
| 
|-
! scope="row" | Dark Motives  
|2010s
| 
| 
| 
|-
! scope="row" | Darkness of Silverfall
| 
| Coconut Council Inc
| 
| 
|-
! scope="row" | Dark Star
| 
| Circle Games
| 
| 
|-
! scope="row" | Darkworld 
| 
| Rebel Enterprises
| 
| 
|-
! scope="row" | Dawn of the Ancients
| 1984
| GSI Game Systems Inc
| 
| 
|-
! scope="row" | Dead Men Tell No Tales  
|2010s
| 
| 
| 
|-
! scope="row" | Death & Sorrow
| 
| Eckert Gaming Group
| 
| 
|-
! scope="row" | Death By Starlight
| 
| Twin Engine Gaming
| 
| 
|-
! scope="row" | Deathlands 2147  
|2010s
| 
| 
| 
|-
! scope="row" | Deathsgate
| 
| Entertainment Plus More, Inc.
| 
| 
|-
! scope="row" | C
|
|Waveney Games
|
|
|-
! scope="row" | Delenda Est Cathargo
|
|Waveney Games
|
|
|-
! scope="row" | Department 5
| 
| JF&L
|
| 
|-
! scope="row" | Destiny
|
|Blue Panther Enterprises
|
|
|-
! scope="row" | Detective
|
|Tudor Games
|
|
|-
! scope="row" | Diaspora
|
| Norman Conquest Games
|
| 
|-
! scope="row" | Dino Wars
|
|Coconut Council, Inc.
|
|
|-
! scope="row" | Doctor Who: The RPG  
|2000s
| 
| 
| 
|-
! scope="row" | Domination
|
| LAMA
|
| 
|-
! scope="row" | Doommaze
| 
| Rick Barr
|
| 
|-
! scope="row" | The Double
|
| Pagoda Games
|
| 
|-
! scope="row" | Down in Flames
|1973
| Lane G. Marinello
|
| 
|-
! scope="row" | Dragonian Worlds
|
| Saul Betesh
|
| 
|-
! scope="row" | DragonQuest
|
| 
|
| 
|-
! scope="row" | Dragonskeep (Crystal Island and Lost Mines modules)
|
| Saul Betesh
|
| 
|-
! scope="row" | Dread Wolf  
|2010s
| 
| 
| 
|-
! scope="row" | Dreamland  
|2010s
| 
| 
| 
|-
! scope="row" | DROIDS
|
| NoGate Consulting
|
| 
|-
! scope="row" | DSX Proteus  
|2000s
| 
| 
| 
|-
! scope="row" | Dukes of Hell
|
| Software Doctors
|
| 
|-
! scope="row" | Dune: Wheels Within Wheels  
|2000s
| 
| 
| 
|-
! scope="row" | Dungeon
|
| Madhouse USA
|
| 
|-
! scope="row" | Dungeoneer PBEM  
|2000s
| 
| 
| 
|-
! scope="row" | Dunkerque – 1940
|Active in 1973
| Simulations Design Corps
|
| 
|-
! scope="row" | Eagle Day: The Battle for Britain
|
| War College Simulations PBM Inc
|
| 
|-
! scope="row" | Earthwars
|
| Software Doctors
|
| 
|-
! scope="row" | Earthwood
|
| Game Systems Inc/KJC Games
|
| 
|-
! scope="row" | Earthwood (Sea Kings)
|
| Game Systems Inc
|
| 
|-
! scope="row" | Eclipse
| 
| Midnight Games
| James Landes (Owner/Moderator)
| 
|-
! scope="row" | EFIFA
| 
| EFIFA
|
|
|-
! scope="row" | EG!: Banana
| 
|  
|
|
|-
! scope="row" | EG!: Blarpo
| 
| Blarpo
|
| 
|-
! scope="row" | EG!: Dangerous Liaisons
| 
| Jerry Spencer
|
|
|-
! scope="row" | EG!: Delon
| 
| Richard Crofts
|
| 
|-
! scope="row" | EG!: Horseguards
| 
| Trevor Gillard
|
|
|-
! scope="row" | EG!: Orc
| 
| Aramaro Adrian
|
|
|-
! scope="row" | EG!: Orleans
| 
|  
|
| 
|-
! scope="row" | EG!: Slumbers
| 
| Brian Jenkins
|
| 
|-
! scope="row" | EG!: Star
| 
| Pete Cooney
|
|
|-
! scope="row" | EG!: Time of Honor
| 
| Quincy Cooper
|
| 
|-
! scope="row" | EIWF
| 
| Create A World, Inc.
|
|
|-
! scope="row" | Elderon  
|2006
| 
| 
| 
|-
! scope="row" | Eldritch
| 
| Play-by-Electron Games
|
|
|-
! scope="row" | Election Year
| 
| Flying Buffalo Inc
|
|
|-
! scope="row" | Electronic Mail American Civil War
|
|ImagiCom, Inc.
|
|
|-
! scope="row" | El Mythico
|
|Graaf Simulations
|
|
|-
! scope="row" | Emberverse PBEM  
|2000s
| 
| 
| 
|-
! scope="row" | Emperor of Space
| 
| 
|
| 
|-
! scope="row" | Empire
|  
| H&R Enterprises
|
|  
|-
! scope="row" | Empires of Corinium
| 
| Viking Games
|
|
|-
! scope="row" | Empire of the Gonzo Galaxy
| 
| Tom Webster
|
| 
|-
! scope="row" | Empyrean Challenge
|1978
| Superior Simulations
|
| 
|-
! scope="row" | Empires for Rent
|
|Blue Panther Enterprises
|
|
|-
! scope="row" | Empires in Space
|
| Bob Stribula
|
| 
|-
! scope="row" | English Civil War Battles
| 
|  
|
| 
|-
! scope="row" | Enter the Blood Pit
|
|Affairs of Honor
| 
| 
|-
! scope="row" | Epic (play-by-mail game)
|
|Midnight Games
|James Landes (Owner/Moderator)
|
|-
! scope="row" | Epic Game II
|August 1986
|Midnight Games
|James Landes (Owner/Moderator)
|
|-
! scope="row" | Epic III
|
|Midnight Games
| 
|
|-
! scope="row" | Epoch of Might
| 
| John Hanson
| 
|
|-
! scope="row" | Epsom
| 
| David Scriven 
|
| 
|-
! scope="row" | Essentially Racing
| 
| Essentially Racing
|
| 
|-
! scope="row" | Europa
| 
| Undying King Games
|
| 
|-
! scope="row" | European Conflict
| 1997
| Conflict Productions
|John Roberts
| 
|-
! scope="row" | EverMoor
|
|Games Adventure
|
|
|-
! scope="row" | Evermoor II
|
|Bronze Star Gaming
|
|
|-
! scope="row" | Exile
| 
| Harlequin Games
|
| 
|-
! scope="row" | Exodus
|
|Grenade Games
|
|
|-
! scope="row" | Fall of Rome
|
|Enlightened Age Entertainment
|
|
|-
! scope="row" | Fall of the Roman Empire
| 
| Jason Oates
|
| 
|-
! scope="row" | Fallen at the First
| 
| Jason Oates
|
|
|-
! scope="row" | Family Wars
|
|Andon Games, Cyclops Gaming
|
|
|-
! scope="row" | The Fantasy Arena
| 
| 
|
| 
|-
! scope="row" | Fantasy Basketball
| 
| Fantasy Basketball
|
|  
|-
! scope="row" | Fantasy Nations
| 
| Roaming Panther Gaming Co.
|
| 
|-
! scope="row" | Fantasy Congress  
|2000s
| 
| 
| 
|-
! scope="row" | Fantasy Cycling 2001
| 
| Ultra Sports
|
|
|-
! scope="row" | Federation Sim Fleet  
|March 7, 1993
| 
| 
| 
|-
! scope="row" | Feudal Lords II
|
|Graaf Simulations
|
|
|-
! scope="row" | Fields of Nephlim
|
|Fields of Nephlim
|
|
|-
! scope="row" | The Final Campaign
|July 1, 1989
|Blue Panther Enterprises
|
| 
|-
! scope="row" | Final Frontier
| 
| Gator Concepts
|
|  
|-
! scope="row" | Finmax
|  
| Advanced Gaming Systems
|
|  
|-
! scope="row" | Fire in the Galaxy
|1990s
|Sar-a-Kan Games; Tactical Simulations, Inc. (1998 release)
|
| 
|-
! scope="row" | Firebreather
|
|Horizon Games
|
|
|-
! scope="row" | Firing Squad
|
| JEM Software, Inc.
|
| 
|-
! scope="row" | The First Crusade
| 
| Kelem Games
|
| 
|-
! scope="row" | First Light
| 1984
| C-Mind Enterprises
| Chris Carrier
| 
|-
! scope="row" | First World
| August 1984
| White Lion Enterprises
|John and Mike O'Brien
|  
|-
! scope="row" | Fleet Maneuvers
|
|Fantastic Simulations
|
| 
|-
! scope="row" | Floodlit Soccer
| 
| 
|
|
|-
! scope="row" | Fog of War
|
|Schubel & Son
|
| 
|-
! scope="row" | Food Chain
| 1990s
| Greg Lindahl
|
|
|-
! scope="row" | Football Maestro
| 
| Maestro Games
|
| 
|-
! scope="row" | Freak Out
|
|Guy M. Games
|
|
|-
! scope="row" | Freedom
|
|Simcoarum Systems
|
|
|-
! scope="row"  | Furoic Age
|
|Starfield Games
|
|
|-
! scope="row" | Galactic Twilight 2050
|
|Create A World, Inc.
|
|
|-
! scope="row" | Gameplan
|
|Graaf Simulations, licensed to Sloth Enterprises (UK)
|
| 
|-
! scope="row" | Gameplan II
|
| 
|
|
|-
! scope="row" | Gamma 39  
|2000s
| 
| 
| 
|-
! scope="row" | Galactic Anarchy
|
|Anarchy by Mail
|
|
|-
! scope="row" | Galactic Confusion
|
|Pierce & Co. 
|
|
|-
! scope="row" | Galactic Empires
|
|Galactic Empires
|
| 
|-
! scope="row" | Galactic Gambit
|
|Bard Interactive Games, Inc.
|
|
|-
! scope="row" | The Galactic Game
| 
| Galactic Society Four
|
|
|-
! scope="row" | Galactic Imperium
| 
| Simulations Unlimited (until 1984 when acquired by Emprise Game Systems)
|
|
|-
! scope="row" | Galactic Invasion 3
| 
| Ultra Sports
|
|
|-
! scope="row" | Galactic Overlord
|
|Steven Arnott
|
|
|-
! scope="row" | Galactic Power
| 
| Vigard Simulations
|
|  
|-
! scope="row" | Galactic Prisoners
|1985
|Grandel Inc
|
| 
|-
! scope="row" | Galactic Empires
|  
| Galactic Empires
|
|  
|-
! scope="row" | Galactic Pest Control
| 
| Tom Webster
|
| 
|-
! scope="row" | Galaxy
| 
| Rebus Games
|
|
|-
! scope="row" | Galaxy Alpha
| 
| KTH, Intergalactic Games
|
|  
|-
! scope="row" | Galaxy Conflict
| 
| KTH
|
| 
|-
! scope="row" | Galaxy II
|
| Brett A. Tondreau
|
| 
|-
! scope="row" | Gallic Wars
| 
| Kage Interactive
|
| 
|-
! scope="row" | Gameplan II
| 
| Clemens & Associates
|
|  
|-
! scope="row" | Gameplan American Football & Soccer Strategy
| 
| Schubel & Son
|
| 
|-
! scope="row" | Games By Mail Football Simulation
| 
| Games By Mail
|
| 
|-
! scope="row" | Ganglords
| 1982 or earlier
| Big City, Inc.
| Darrel A. Plant
| 
|-
! scope="row" | Gateway to the Stars
|Ended 1987
|Total Simulations, Inc. (closed 1987)
|
|
|-
! scope="row" | Ghoulies Ghosties and Beasties  
|2010s
| 
| 
| 
|-
! scope="row" | Gladiator: The Legacy of Heraklês
|
|Dragon Games
|
|  
|-
! scope="row" | Gladiators of Death
|
|Fantasy & Futuristic Simulations
|
|
|-
! scope="row" | Global Conquest
| 
| Keith Langley
|
| 
|-
! scope="row" | Global Diplomacy
| 
| E-Mail Games
|
| 
|-
! scope="row" | Global Supremacy
|
|Schubel & Son
|
|
|-
! scope="row" | Global Supremacy III
|
|Schubel & Son
|
|
|-
! scope="row" | Glory
|
|HCS Games
|
|
|-
! scope="row" | Glory II
|
|HCS Games
|
|
|-
! scope="row" | Glory to the Lance
|
| Nova Games
|
| 
|-
! scope="row" | Gobbal
| 
| 
|
|
|-
! scope="row" | The Godfather
|circa 1986
| The Play By Mail Company
|
| 
|-
! scope="row" | The Godfather of Astini
|
| Godfather Games
|
| 
|-
! scope="row" | Godling: Quest for the Realm
|  
| Mouchet Software Corporation
| 
| 
|-
! scope="row" | Golden Realms II
| 
|Spellbinder II
|
|
|-
! scope="row" | Gorlos
| 
| Chris Bury, World Fictional Wrestling
|
|
|-
! scope="row" | Grand Alliance
|
| Simcoarum Systems
|
| 
|-
! scope="row" | Gray RPG  
|2010s
| 
| 
| 
|-
! scope="row" | Great Game: 1820
| 
| Great Game
|
| 
|-
! scope="row" | Great White Hunter
| 
| Steven Arnott
|
| 
|-
! scope="row" | Gridiron Stats
| 
| Danny McConnell, Ab Initio Games
|
|
|-
! scope="row" | Guardian
| 
| Stephen Richardson, Guardian Games
|
|
|-
! scope="row" | Guilds of Honor
|Approximately 1995
| 
|
| 
|-
! scope="row" | Gunboat
|
| Agema Publications
|
| 
|-
! scope="row" | Gunboat Empires
| 
| 
|
| 
|-
! scope="row" | Gunners
|
| Rebel Games
|
| 
|-
! scope="row" | Guns of 14
|
|Simcoarum Systems
|
|
|-
! scope="row" | Half Time PBM Football
|
| Half Time PBM Football
|
| 
|-
! scope="row" | Hall of Champions
|
| Dynamic Games
|
| 
|-
! scope="row" | Hand of the Demon
| 
|Spellbinder II
|
|
|-
! scope="row" | Harry Potter the War is On  
|2010s
| 
| 
| 
|-
! scope="row" | Haunted House
| Paper Tigers, Eclipse Consulting, Inc.
| Eclipse Consulting, Inc. acquired in 1995 from Paper Tigers
|
| 
|-
! scope="row" | Haven
|
| Different Worlds Publications
|
| 
|-
! scope="row" | Heart of the West  
|2010s
| 
| 
| 
|-
! scope="row" | Heaven's Above
| 
|Spellbinder II
|
|
|-
! scope="row" | Heroic Age
|
| Games Without Frontiers
|
| 
|-
! scope="row" | High Kings Tourney
| 
| 
|
| 
|-
! scope="row" | Highlander
| 
| Claemor Entertainment Inc.
|
|  
|-
! scope="row"  | High Tide
|Circa 1983
|Viking Games
|
| 
|-
! scope="row" | Hoopplan
| 
| 
|
| 
|-
! scope="row" | Hoplite Encounter
| 
| 
| 
| 
|-
! scope="row" | Horizon's End!
| 
| Schubel & Son
|Duane Wilcoxson (Designer)
|  
|-
! scope="row" | HorseMen
|
| Saul Betesh
|
| 
|-
! scope="row" | Horse Racing
| 
| 
|
|
|-
! scope="row" | Horses For Courses
| 
|Spellbinder II
|
|
|-
! scope="row" | Hoss Soljers
| 
| Devil's Advocate Games
|
| 
|-
! scope="row" | The Hunt
| 
| JF&L
|
| 
|-
! scope="row" | Hunting
| 
| DMC Games
|Dave Cooksey
| 
|-
! scope="row" | Hunting 2
| 
| DMC Games
|Dave Cooksey
|  
|-
! scope="row" | HyperXpansion
| 
| 
|
| 
|-
! scope="row" | ICWF
| 
| 
|
| 
|-
!Illuminati PBM
|Playtest complete May 1984, play began June 1984
|Adventure Systems, Flying Buffalo
|Draper Kauffman
|
|-
! scope="row" | Immortals
| 
| Synchronicity, Inc.
|
| 
|-
! scope="row" | Imperium
| 
| E-Mail Games
|
| 
|-
! scope="row" | Imperium Challenge
| 
| Superior Simulations
|
| 
|-
! scope="row" | Imperial Conquest
| 
| Armageddon Games
|
| 
|-
! scope="row" | Imperial Expansion
| 
| E-Mail Games
|
| 
|-
! scope="row" | Imperial Games
| 
| Applied Gaming Technologies Inc.
|
| 
|-
! scope="row" | Infinite Conflict
| 
| Gemini Systems, Inc.
|
| 
|-
! scope="row" | INS 20,000 BC
| 
| 
|
| 
|-
! scope="row" | INS 2001
| Bob Bost (gamemaster)
| International Research Associates (designer); Atomic Games (licensee)
|
|  
|-
! scope="row" | International Internet Football
| 
| Phildee Enterprises
|
|
|-
! scope="row" | In the Navy
| 
| J&J Combat Simulations
|
|  
|-
! scope="row" | Into the Maelstrom
| 
| Maelstrom Games
|
| 
|-
! scope="row" | Into Infinity
| May 1988
| Battle-Magic Gaming
|
| 
|-
! scope="row" | Industrial Empire
| 
| Gamer's Den
|
|
|-
! scope="row" | Inferno
| 
| Undying King Games
|
| 
|-
! scope="row" | Intrigue
| June 1990
| White Lion Enterprises
|
| 
|-
! scope="row" | IronBlood
| 
|  
|
|  
|-
! scope="row" | Iron Kings
| 
| Play-by-Electron Games
|
| 
|-
! scope="row" | Iron & Steam
| 
| Prime Time Programming (Midnight Games as of 1994)
|
|
|-
! scope="row" | Island Takeover
|Approximately 1995
| 
|
| 
|-
! scope="row" | Isle of Crowns
| 
| Adventures By Mail
|
| 
|-
! scope="row" | Island of Kesmai
| 
|  
|  
|
|-
! scope="row" | It's a Crime!
| 
| Adventures By Mail
|
| 
|-
! scope="row" | Ixion's Wheel
| 
| Undying King Games
|
| 
|-
! scope="row" | IWBL
|
|Create A World, Inc.
|
|
|-
! scope="row" | Japanese Crusade
| 
| Jolly Goblin Games
|
|  
|-
! scope="row" | Jetball
| 
|  Alchemist's Guild
|
|  
|-
! scope="row" | JF&L's Kings
| 
| JF&L
|
| 
|-
! scope="row" | Joust
| 
| King's Guild, Inc.
|
|  
|-
! scope="row" | Jurien Range
| 
| PBM Adventures
|
| 
|-
! scope="row" | Kaoswars
| 
| 
|
|
|-
! scope="row" | Kickabout
| 
| Spellbinder Games
|
| 
|-
! scope="row" | Kavernes
| 
|Marguerite Dias
|
| 
|-
! scope="row" | Keys of Medokh
| 
|  Dynamic Games, Temple Games
|
| 
|-
! scope="row" | Krahlizek: The Last Battle
| 
| Aggressive Addiction Games, Inc.
|
| 
|-
! scope="row" | Kill Ted!
|
|Blue Panther Enterprises
|
|
|-
! scope="row" | King of Kings
| 
| King of Kings
|
|
|-
! scope="row" | Kings
| 
| JF&L
|
| 
|-
! scope="row" | Kingdom
| 
| Graaf Simulations
|
| 
|-
! scope="row" | Kingdom Quests
| 
| Chain Mail Games
|
| 
|-
! scope="row" | Kingdom's & Conquest
| 
| Tudor Games
|
| 
|-
! scope="row" | Kingdoms of Telgard
| 
| Kingdoms of Telgard
|
| 
|-
! scope="row" | Kings 
| 
| Dragon Games
|
| 
|-
! scope="row" | The King's Birthday
| 
| KTH
|
| 
|-

! scope="row" | Kingsearth
| 
| Kings Guild, Inc.
|
|
|-
! scope="row" | Kings of Steel
| 
| Stephen White
|
|
|-
! scope="row" | Kings of Zanthia
| 
| Phildee Enterprises
|
|
|-
! scope="row" | Kings
| 
| JF&L
|
| 
|-
! scope="row" | Kings & Things*
| 
| Andon Games, Graaf Simulations, licensed to Sloth Enterprises (UK)
|
| 
|-
! scope="row" | Kingsearth
| 
| Kings Guild Inc
|
| 
|-
! scope="row" | Kings of the Boryian Empire
| 
| Paper Generals
|
| 
|-
! scope="row" | Kings of the Boryian Empire II
| 
| Piranha Games
|
| 
|-
! scope="row" | Kings War
|
| Schubel & Son
|
| 
|-
! scope="row" | KLIP
| 
| Pavel Lyakhovskiy
|
| 
|-
! scope="row" | Knight Commander
| 
| Galactic Society Four
|
|
|-
! scope="row" | Knights of Chivalry
| Circa 1983
| Odyssean War Games
|
|  
|-
! scope="row" | Kobe II
| 
| Piranha Games
|
| 
|-
! scope="row" | The Land of Karrus
| 1990
| Paper Tigers
|Jean Brown (Designer/Moderator)
| 
|-
! scope="row" | LandLords
| 1984
| Quest Computer Services
|
| 
|-
! scope="row" | L'Arene
| 
| Megalith Games
|
|  
|-
! scope="row" | Lawman
| 
| Megaton Enterprise
|
| 
|-
! scope="row" | Legends: North Island Campaign
| 
| Dragon Games
|
| 
|-
! scope="row" | Legends: Realm of the Immortals
| 
| Dragon Games
|
| 
|-
! scope="row" | Legends: the Crystal Shard
| 
| Dragon Games
|
| 
|-
! scope="row" | Legions of the Empire
| 
| Dymar Enterprises
|
| 
|-
! scope="row" | Leyenda
| 
| Cruachan Diversions
|
| 
|-
! scope="row" | Lizards
| 1994
| Flying Buffalo Inc, Roma (Aus), Circle (NZ), Madhouse (UK)
|Jonathan Bean (Designer)
| 
|-
! scope="row" | L&L Basketball
| 
| L&L Activities
|
|  
|-
! scope="row" | L&L Football
| 
| L&L Activities
|
|  
|-
! scope="row" | Logan's Run
| Circa 1983
| Knights of Chivalry
|
| 
|-
! scope="row" | Lomaka
| 1993
| Paper Tigers
|
| 
|-
! scope="row" | Loot the Castle
| 
| Tom Webster
|
| 
|-
! scope="row" | Lords of Aphrodite
| 
| 
|
| 
|-
! scope="row" | Lords of Europe
| 
| M&M Hobbies
|
| 
|-
! scope="row" | Lords of Harkanis: The Prophecy
|
|War College Simulations, Inc.
|
| 
|-
! scope="row" | Lords of the Dark Horse
| 
| Adventures Design Group, Inc.
|
| 
|-
! scope="row" | Lord of the Land
|
|Create A World, Inc.
|
|
|-
! scope="row" | Lord of the Realm
|
|HFR Games
|
|
|-
! scope="row" | Lords of Destiny
|Early 1990s 
| Maelstrom Games
|
| 
|-
! scope="row" | Lords of the Blood Sea
|
| Godfather Games
|
| 
|-
! scope="row" | Lords of the Dark Horse
| 
| Adventures Design Group, Inc.
|
| 
|-
! scope="row" | Lords of the Earth: Campaign 1
| 
| Thomas Harlan
|
| 
|-

! scope="row" | Lords of the Earth: Campaign 2
| 
| Colin Dunnigan
|
| 
|-
! scope="row" | Lords of the Earth: Campaign 4
| 
| David Adams
|
| 
|-
! scope="row" | Lords of the Earth: Campaign 5
| 
| Dean Patterson
|
| 
|-
! scope="row" | Lords of the Earth: Campaign 7
| 
| Eddie Hartwell
|
| 
|-
! scope="row" | Lords of the Earth: Campaign 8
| 
| Paul Flinton
|
| 
|-
! scope="row" | Lords of the Earth: Campaign 10
| 
| David Adams
|
| 
|-
! scope="row" | Lords of the Earth: Campaign 11
| 
| Phil Baird
|
| 
|-
! scope="row" | Lords of the Earth: Campaign 13
| 
| Chris Cornuelle
|
| 
|-
! scope="row" | Lords of the Earth: Campaign 16
| 
| Steve Olson
|
| 
|-
! scope="row" | Lords of the Earth: Campaign 19
| 
| Steve Olson
|
| 
|-
! scope="row" | Lords of the Earth: Campaign 20
| 
| Eddie Efsic
|
| 
|-
! scope="row" | Lords of the Earth: Campaign 23
| 
| Michael Helmsing
|
| 
|-
! scope="row" | Lords of the Earth: Campaign 24
| 
| Lesley Nielson
|
| 
|-
! scope="row" | Lords of the Earth: Campaign 25
| 
| David Mattingly
|
| 
|-
! scope="row" | Lords of the Earth: Campaign 42
| 
| Leslie Dodd
|
| 
|-
! scope="row" | Lords of the Earth: Campaign 51
| 
| JJ Martel
|
| 
|-
! scope="row" | Lords of the Fray
| 
| Ethereal Edge Enterprises
|
| 
|-
! scope="row" | Lords of the Galactic Rim
| 
| Nebula Star Productions
|
| 
|-
! scope="row" | Lords of Valetia
| 1977
| RB&B Design Operations
|
| 
|-
! scope="row" | Lost Knowledge
| 
| Compu-Caper Gaming
|
| 
|-
! scope="row" | LT Wars
| 
| Spellbinder Games
|
| 
|-
! scope="row" | Mageborn
| 
| DFS Productions
|
|
|-
! scope="row" | Magebor: Arena
| 
| DFS Productions
|
|
|-
! scope="row" | Mall Maniacs
|1987
|Creative Simulations
|
|
|-
! scope="row" | Magic Duel
| 
| JF&L
|
| 
|-
! scope="row" | Magika
|
|ChoZen FroZen Games
|
|
|-
! scope="row" | MagiQuest
|
| Palace Simulations
|
|
|-
! scope="row" | Magocracy
|1986
|Mialdian Press
|
|
|-
! scope="row" | Mandragora: Shadows Lengthen
|
| Nova Games
|
| 
|-
! scope="row"  | Manifest Destiny
|Early 1980s
|Viking Games
|
| 
|-
! scope="row" | Masters of Magic
|
|HCS Games
|
|
|-
! scope="row" | Maxi-Challenge
| 
|  
|
| 
|-
! scope="row" | Mazeworld
| 
| Acme Game Moderators
|
| 
|-
! scope="row" | MedioEvo
| 
| The PBM Locomotive Srl
| 
| 
|-
! scope="row" | Merchant Lords
| 
| Wishful Thinking
| 
| 
|-
! scope="row" | MegaPrix
| 
| Adventure Simulation Games
| 
| 
|-
! scope="row" | The Melding (Name change from World of Velgor)
| 1985 
| Kelstar Enterprises
| 
| 
|-
! scope="row" | Mercenaries and Empires
| Through Oct. 1984
| Sage
|
| 
|-
! scope="row" | Mercenary
| 
| Piranha Games
|
| 
|-
! scope="row" | MiiSL
| 
| MiiSL, Sando Chiavuzzo
|
| 
|-
! scope="row" | Military Khralizek
| 
| Aggressive Addiction Games, Inc.
|
| 
|-
! scope="row" | Militech
| 
| Apex Games
| 
| 
|-
! scope="row" | Miller Systems WWII Campaign
|Approximately 1995
| 
|
| 
|-
! scope="row" | Mind the Gap
| 
| John Hanson
| 
| 
|-
! scope="row" | Mindgate BBS
|
| Mindgate
|
| 
|-
! scope="row" | Mining Meyham
|
| Time Patterns PBM Games
|
| 
|-
! scope="row" | MMCII
|
| 
|
| 
|-
! scope="row" | Modern World Conquest
|
| Prime Time Simulations
|
| 
|-
! scope="row" | Moon Base
| 
| Flying Buffalo, Inc.
|
| 
|-
! scope="row"  | Monarchs
|
|Rick Barr
|
|
|-
! scope="row"  | Moneylender
|
|Rick Barr
|
|
|-
! scope="row"  | Monopoly
|
|Mail Games
|
|
|-
! scope="row" | Monsters
| 
| Play-by-Electron Games
|
| 
|-
! scope="row" | Moscow '41
| 
| Vigard Simulations
|
| 
|-
! scope="row" | Murania
| 
| Michael Halvis
|
| 
|-
! scope="row" | Murder!
| 
| 
|
| 
|-
! scope="row" | Muskets and Mules
| 
| Historical Engineering
|
| 
|-
! scope="row" | Mutant Wars
| 
| Cutting Edge Games
|
| 
|-
! scope="row" | Mystic Arena
| 
| Mystic Arena
|
| 
|-
! scope="row" | The Mystic Land
|
| Create A World, Inc.
|
|
|-
! scope="row" | A National Will
| 
| Simcoarum Systems
|
| 
|-
! scope="row" | Netrunner
| 
| Coconut Council
|
| 
|-
! scope="row" | New Dawn
| 
| Marguerite Dias/New Dawn
|
| 
|-
! scope="row" | New Order
| 1987
| C2 Simulations
|
| 
|-
! scope="row" | New World
| 
| JF&L
|
| 
|-
! scope="row" | The Next Empire
| Origins 1988
| Cyborg Games, later Reality Simulations
|
| 
|-
! scope="row" | The Next Empire II
| 
| Reality Simulations Inc
| 
|  
|-
! scope="row" | The Next Frontier
| 1990 (v1.1 release)
| Sphered Effulgent Technologies (SET)
| 
| 
|-
! scope="row" | Nexus of Mystery
|
| Creative Management Services
|
|
|-
! scope="row" | NFL Pro League Football
| 
| Gamer's Guild
|
| 
|-
! scope="row" | Nguyen Hue
|
| Vigard Simulations
|
|  
|-
! scope="row" | Node Warriors
| 
| Genesis Game Design
|
|
|-
! scope="row" | Nuclear Threat
|
| JF&L
|
|  
|-
! scope="row" | Nuclear War
|
| Flying Buffalo, Inc.
|
| 
|-
! scope="row" | Odyssey: Black Piper
|1998 or earlier
| Lucky Llama Games
|
| 
|-
! scope="row" | Odyssey: Heroes' Quest
|1997
| KSK Concepts
|
| 
|-
! scope="row" | Odyssey: Only the Strong
|1998 or earlier
| KSK Concepts, Lucky Llama Games
|
| 
|-
! scope="row" | Offside Ref!
| 
| Dave Carter, Scorpiogames
|
| 
|-
! scope="row" | Olympia
| 
| Shadow Island Games
|
|
|-
! scope="row"  | Olympia: The Age of Gods
|
|Shadow Island Games
|
|
|-
! scope="row" | One-on-One World Conquest
|
| Prime Time Simulations
|
| 
|-
! scope="row" | One True Faith
|
| Keith Langley
|
| 
|-
! scope="row" | On-Paper Baseball
| 
| On-Paper Baseball
|
|  
|-
! scope="row" | Operation Barbarossa: The Battle for Russia: 1941-45
|
| War College Simulations PBM, Inc.
|
| 
|-
! scope="row" | Orc Ba'al
|Approximately 1995
| 
|
| 
|-
! scope="row" | The Orion Nebula
|
| Orpheus Publishing Corporation
|
| 
|-
! scope="row" | On-Paper Baseball
| 
|On-Paper Baseball
|
| 
|-
! scope="row" | Out Time Days
|Werner and Vicki Freitas (Designer and editor)
| Twin Engine Gaming
|Ended May 1, 1992
|  
|- 
! scope="row" | Outer Reaches
|
| Earnshaw Enterprises
|
| 
|-
! scope="row" | Outpost
|
| Spyder Games
|
| 
|-
! scope="row"  | Overland
|
|Shadow Island Games
|
|
|-
! scope="row" | Overlord 5
| 
| Jeff Perkins
|
| 
|-
! scope="row" | Pacific Conflict
|
| Advent Games
|
| 
|-
! scope="row" | Pandemonium Circus
| 
| Distant Vistas
|
| 
|-
! scope="row" | Parade
|
| 
|
| 
|-
! scope="row" | Paths to Glory
|
| Triumph Game Systems
|
| 
|-
! scope="row" | PBM-Close Action
|  
| Command Authority Games
| 
| 
|-
! scope="row" | PBMFL
|
| The Mailbox
|
| 
|-
! scope="row" | Peacemaker-Peacebreaker
|
| Pierce & Co.
|
|  
|-
! scope="row" | Pellic Quest
|
| Conflict Interaction Associates
|
| 
|-
! scope="row" | Penalty!
| 
| Dave Carter, Scorpiogames
|
| 
|-
! scope="row" | Pentagarnia
| 
| Steve M. White
|
| 
|-
! scope="row" | Peril II
| 1984
| K&C Enterprises
|
| 
|-
! scope="row" | Perseus Arm
|
| Perseus Arm Enterprises
|
| 
|-
! scope="row" | Phantasy Civil War Alliance
|
| Tri-J Communications
|
| 
|-
! scope="row" | Phantom Star Raider
|
| Tony Watson
|
| 
|-
! scope="row" | Phoenix
|1989
| Gamer's Den
|
| 
|-
! scope="row" | Phoneix Rising
| 
| Phildee Enterprises
|
|
|-
! scope="row" | Pieces of Eight!
| 
| Undying King Games
|
| 
|-
! scope="row" | Planetarion
| 
|  
|
| 
|-
! scope="row" | Platoon Leader
|
| Triad Simulations
|
| 
|-
! scope="row" | Play-By-Mail Football League
|
| The Mailbox
|
| 
|-
! scope="row" | Plexxon
| 
| US, UK, CAN
|
| 
|-
! scope="row" | Polaris
| 
| Daredevil
|
|
|-
! scope="row" | Pollux
| 
| CyberVentures Ent. Group
|
| 
|-
! scope="row" | Pop Tarts
| 
| Received Wisdom
|
| 
|-
! scope="row" | Port Hazard
|
|Speculation Games
| 
| 
|-
! scope="row" | Portinium
|December 1990
| Enchanted Horizons
|
| 
|-
! scope="row" | Power
|Ended 1985
| ECI
|
|  
|-
! scope="row" | Power+
|
| ECI
|
| 
|-
! scope="row" | Powerstar
|
| South Bay Games
|
| 
|-
! scope="row" | Premier Football
| 
| Harlequin Games
|
| 
|-
! scope="row" | Primer Inter Pares
| 
| John Hanson
| 
| 
|-
! scope="row" | Privateers
|
|Tudor Games
|
|
|-
! scope="row" | Private Eye
|
|JF&L
|
|  
|-
! scope="row" | Private Sector
|
|Treesahran Industries
|
|
|-
! scope="row" | Privs Inter Pares
|
| Interesting Times
|
|
|-
! scope="row" | Professional Basketball League
| 
|  
|
| 
|-
! scope="row"  | Prokhorovka
|Circa 1983
|Viking Games
|
|
|-
! scope="row" | Psyche
| 
| DMC Games
|Dave Cooksey
| 
|-
! scope="row" | Pub Quest
|
| Warrior Games
|
|
|-
! scope="row" | Quadrant Wars
| 
| Quest Game Inc.
|
| 
|-
! scope="row" | Québec 1759
|Active 1973
| Gamma Two Games Ltd.
|
| 
|-
! scope="row" | Quest for Adventure
| 
| JF&L
|
| 
|-
! scope="row" | Quest of Gorr
|Only briefly on the market
| Game Masters International
|
| 
|-
! scope="row" | Quest of the Great Jewels
|1983
| Zorph Enterprises
| Mike Shefler (Original developer/moderator)
| 
|-
! scope="row" | Quest: The World of Kharne
|
| Adventures By Mail
|
| 
|-
! scope="row" | Rainbow Warrior
| 
| The Blue Rhino
|
| 
|-
! scope="row" | Raumkrieg
|
| Flying Buffalo
|
| 
|-
! scope="row" | Realm
|
| Full Moon Gaming
|
| 
|-
! scope="row" | Realms of Altair
| 
| Full Moon Gaming
|
|  
|-
! scope="row" | Realms of Fantasy
|
| Graaf Simulations
|
| 
|-
! scope="row" | Realms of Shaharasai
|Early 1994
| Darkwood Enchantment
|
| 
|-
! scope="row" | Realms of Sword and Thunder
|1982
| Empire Games, Inc.
|Glenn Holliday and Chris Peterson (creators)
| 
|-
! scope="row" | Realpolitik 
|
| Triad Simulations
|
| 
|-
! scope="row" | Renaissance
| 
| Constantine Xanthos
|
| 
|-
! scope="row" | Renegade Legion (Centurion)
| 
| Fantasy Workship (US), Pagoda Games (UK)
|
|
|-
! scope="row" | Return of the Empire
| 
| Piranha Games
|
| 
|-
! scope="row" | Revenge
|
| Devil's Advocate Games
|
| 
|-
! scope="row" | Riftlords
|
| Flying Buffalo Inc
|
|  
|-
! scope="row" | Right of Kings
|
| Last World Games
|
| 
|-
! scope="row" | Rimworlds
|1984
| Palace Simulations
|
| 
|-
! scope="row" | Rings of Darkness
|
| Ark Royal Games (Licensed from Roma Games of Australia)
|
| 
|-
! scope="row" | Roadkill 2115
| 1990s
| Imaginary Enterprises
| 
|
|-
! scope="row" | The Road to the White House
| 1998
| Tactical Simulation, Inc.
| 
|
|-
! scope="row" | Robalgon
| 1984
| Robalgon
| 
|
|-
! scope="row" | Robot Armies
| 
| Schubel & Son
|
| 
|-
! scope="row" | Room 4
|
| Devil's Advocate Games
|
| 
|-
! scope="row" | Ruler of the Galactic Web
|1987
|Quail Canyon Systems
|
|
|-
! scope="row" | The Runes of Inngoal
|
|Harold Kercher
|
|
|-
! scope="row" | SABRE
|
| Pace
|
|
|-
! scope="row" | Sail the Solar Wind
| 
| Imagination Unlimited
|
|  
|-
! scope="row" | Samurai Warlords
|
|Bill Paspaliaris
|
|
|-
! scope="row" | Saga
| Ended 1987
|Imagery
|
|
|-
! scope="row"  | Samurai Warlord
|
|Bill Paspaliaris
|
|
|-
! scope="row" | Sarakond Campaign
| 
| Richard Breton
|
| 
|-
! scope="row" | Satellite Down
|
|GDW
|
|
|-
! scope="row" | Saturnalia
| 
| Sloth Enterprises
|
|  
|-
! scope="row" | Scales of Justice
|
|Tudor Games
|
| 
|-
! scope="row" | Sceptre
| 
|Sceptre Roleplaying
|
|
|-
! scope="row" | Scoresheet Baseball
| 
|Scoresheet Sports
|
| 
|-
! scope="row" | Scoresheet Football
| 
|Scoresheet Sports
|
| 
|-
! scope="row" | Scramble
| 
|Furypost Games
|
|
|-
! scope="row" | Sea Kings
| 
|Game Systems, Inc.
|
| 
|-
! scope="row" | Seconds Out
| 
| Tactics
| Mark Walton
| 
|-
! scope="row"  | Secrets of Trime
| 1985
|Frontier Games
| 
|
|-
! scope="row"  | Sed 9
|
|Jagg Productions
|
|
|-

! scope="row"  | Seeds of Destruction
|
|Eckert Gaming Group
|
|
|-
! scope="row"  | Seeking Realm Knights
|
|Zion Games
|
|
|-
! scope="row" | Serim Ral
| 
| Harlequin Games
|
| 
|-
! scope="row" | Shadow Lords
| 
| Post-it Games
|
| 
|-
! scope="row" | A Shadow of Earth
| 
| Devil's Advocate Games
|
| 
|-
! scope="row"  | Siege America
|
|Schubel & Son, licensed to Red Talon Gaming of Pennsylvania.
|
|
|-–
! scope="row" | Sirius Command
| 
| Inner Dimension Games
|
| 
|-
! scope="row" | Silverdawn
| 
| Entertainment Concepts, Inc (ECI)
| Designer: Jim Dutton; Jeff Avery
| 
|-
! scope="row" | Singularity
| 
| Shadow Island Games
|
| 
|-
! scope="row" | Skaal
| 
| The Gamesmiths
|
|  
|-
! scope="row" | Smuggler's Run
| 
| Distant Visas
|
| 
|-
! scope="row" | Sol III
| 
| Conflict Productions
| 
| 
|-
! scope="row" | Sovereignty
| 
| Silvius and Berchtold
|
| 
|-
! scope="row" | Space 101
| 
| C2 Simulations
|
| 
|-
! scope="row" | Space Battle
| 1980
| Flying Buffalo
|
| 
|-
! scope="row" | Space Bounty
| 
| Universal Simulations
|
| 
|-
! scope="row" | Space Combat
| 
| Twin Engine Gaming
|
| |
|-
! scope="row" | Spacefarer
|
| Tansfaal Enterprises
|
|  
|-
! scope="row" | Space Heroes
|  
| Space Heroes
|
|  
|-
! scope="row" | Space Miner
| 
| The Blue Rhino
|
| 
|-
! scope="row" | Special Agent
| 
| TL Designs
|
| 
|-
! scope="row" | Speculate
|
| Yellowseed Games
|
|
|-
! scope="row" | Spiral Arm
|
| Graaf Simulations
|
|
|-
! scope="row" | Spiral Arm II
|
| Graaf Simulations
|
|
|-
! scope="row" | Smuggler's Run
| 
| Adventures By Mail
|
| 
|-
! scope="row" | Soccer Supremos
|
|GAD Games
|
|
|-
! scope="row" | SpyKor
|
| Sudden Asylum
|
|
|-
! scope="row" | St. Valentines Day Massacre
|
| Mindgate
|
|
|-
! scope="row" | Stand & Deliver
|
| 
|
|
|-
! scope="row" | Starblazer I
| 
| 
|
|  
|-
! scope="row" | Starcapture
| 
| Bill Wood
|
|  
|-
! scope="row" | Star Cluster
| 
| Lief Stensson
|
| 
|-
! scope="row" | Star Cluster II
| 
| C-T Simulations
|
|
|-
! scope="row" | Star Cluster Omega
|
| C-T Simulations
|
|
|-
! scope="row" | Star Cluster One
|
| The Buchanan Company
|
|
|-
! scope="row" | Stardragon
|1983
| Stardragon
|Carl Savage
|
|-
! scope="row" | Star Empires II
| 
|Spellbinder II
|
|
|-
! scope="row" | Starfleet Academy
| 
| JF&L
|
|  
|-
! scope="row" | Star Fleet Warlords
|
| Agents of Gaming
|
|
|-
! scope="row" | Starforce Battles
|
| 
|Charles Mosteller, Scott Estrin, Bob Dickinson, and John Bryne (Design)
| 
|-
! scope="row" | Starmaster
| 
| Schubel & Son
|
| 
|-
! scope="row" | Star Moguls
|pre-1993
| 
|
| 
|-
! scope="row" | Star Quest
|
| Deltax Gaming
|
| 
|-
! scope="row" | Stars of the Dark Well
|
| Mindgate
|
| 
|-
! scope="row" | Star of Uldor
| Circa 1983
| Genji Games
|
|  
|-
! scope="row" | Star Saga
|
| Infinite Odysseys
|
| 
|-
! scope="row" | Star Sword
| 
| Entertainment Plus More, Inc.
| 
| 
|-

! scope="row" | Star Trek: The Correspondence Game
|
| Entertainment Concepts
|
| 
|-
! scope="row" | Star Venture
| 1982
| Schubel & Son
|
| 
|-
! scope="row" | Starbase
|
| Quest Games
|
| 
|-
! scope="row" | StarGlobe
|1984 or earlier
| DragonByte
|Ken Mulholland (of Time Patterns)
| 
|-
! scope="row" | Star King
|
| Software Doctors
|
| 
|-
! scope="row" | Starlord
|
| 
|Mike Singleton
| 
|-
! scope="row" | Starmagic
|
| Cosmos Creation Company
|
| 
|-
! scope="row" | Starmagic II
|
| Clemens & Associates
|
| 
|-
! scope="row" | Starmaster
|
| Schubel & Son
|Richard Lloyd (designer)
| 
|-
! scope="row" | Starmaster II
|
| Schubel & Son
|Debbie Leonard (Development)
| 
|-
! scope="row" | Starquest (different from JF&L's game)
| 
| Entertainment Concepts, Inc.
|
| 
|-
! scope="row" | Starquest (different from Entertainment Concepts, Inc.'s game)
| 
| JF&L
|
| 
|-
! scope="row" | Star Realm
| 
| Dynamic Games
|
| 
|-
! scope="row" | Star-Saga
| 
| Infinite Odysseys
|
| 
|-
! scope="row" | Starship Command
|
| Elite Simulations
|
| 
|-
! scope="row" | Starway II
| 
| Keith Langley
|
| 
|-
! scope="row" | Starwind
| 
| CraftGames
|
| 
|-
! scope="row" | Stat-Sports Pro Football
| 
| Stat-Sports
|
| 
|-
! scope="row" | State of War
| 
| Game Systems Inc
|
| 
|-
! scope="row" | Stat Sports Football
| 
| Stat-Sports
|
|  
|-
! scope="row" | Steel, Fire, and Blood
|
| George Franchi
|
| 
|-
! scope="row" | Stellar Conquest
| 
| 
|
|  
|-
! scope="row" | Stellar Crusades
|
| Simulated Genius
|
| 
|-
! scope="row" | Stellar Dynasty
| 
| The Game Company
|
| 
|-
! scope="row" | Stellar Empire
| 
| Rick Barr
|
|  
|-
! scope="row" | Stellar Knights
| 
| Zion Games
|
| 
|-
! scope="row" | Stellar Marine
| 
| Zion Games
|
| 
|-
! scope="row" | Stellar Realms
| 
| HCS Games
| 
| 
|-
! scope="row" | Stellar Syndicate
|1987
|Quail Canyon Systems
|
|
|-
! scope="row" | Stellar Warlords
|
|International Software
|Brad Lampl (Creator and Moderator)
|
|-
! scope="row" | Storm Over Dixie
| 
| Armageddon Games
|
| 
|-
! scope="row" | Strategic Conflict
| 1983
| Schubel & Son
|
| 
|-
! scope="row" | Strategic Imperial Conquest
|
| 
|
| 
|-
! scope="row" | Strategos
| 
| 
|
| 
|-
! scope="row" | Strike it Rich
|
|HCS Games
|
|
|-
! scope="row" | Struggle of Nations
|
|www.webworldinc.com
|
|
|-
! scope="row" | Succession
| 
| Games Without Frontiers
|
|  
|-
! scope="row" | Super Filet Wars
| Circa 1983
| Diadem Enterprises
|
|  
|-
! scope="row" | SuperNova II
| 
| Rolling Thunder Games
|
|  
|-
! scope="row" | Supremacy
| 
| Andon Games
|
|  
|-
! scope="row" | Swashbuckler
|
|Paspa Games
|
|
|-
! scope="row" | Swords of Draknaar
| 
| Obsidian Production
| Saul Betesh
|
|-

! scope="row" | Swords of Pelarn
| April 1984
| Midnight Games
| Jim Robinson
| 
|-
! scope="row" | Swords of the Gods
|
| Galactic Simulations
|
|
|-
! scope="row" | Sword Lords
| 
| 
|
|  
|-
! scope="row" | Succession
|
| Games Without Frontiers
|
|
|-
! scope="row" | Suergan: The Shattered Isles
|
| Mindshift Design LLC
|
|
|-
! scope="row" | Sulfer City
| 
| Devil's Advocate Games
|
| 
|-
! scope="row" | Super Hero Nation
|
| Create A World, Inc.
|
|
|-
! scope="row" | SuperNova
|1986
| Rolling Thunder Games
|
|
|-
! scope="row" | Supernova II
|
| Rolling Thunder Games
|
|
|-
! scope="row" | Supremacy
|
| Graf Simulations
|
|
|-
! scope="row" | Supreme Empires
|
| Create A World, Inc.
|
|
|-
! scope="row" | Survival Challenge
|Ended 1987
| Mindgate
|
| 
|-
! scope="row" | Survivors
| 
| Ultimate Empires, Inc.
|
| 
|-
! scope="row" |Suzerainty
|
|7th Dimension Gaming
|
|
|-
! scope="row" | Swords at Sunset
| 
| J&J Combat Simulations
|
| 
|-
! scope="row" | System III: Star King
|
|Galactic Centurian Systems
|
|
|-
! scope="row" | Tactical Assault Group
|
|Quest Games, Inc.
|
|
|-
! scope="row" | Tactical Command
| 
| Galactic Society Four
|
|
|-
! scope="row" | Talwaithe
|1981
|
|
|
|-
! scope="row" | Tanx
|  
| Fauchard Enterprises
|
|  
|-
! scope="row" | Task Force
| 
| Quest Games
|
|  
|-
! scope="row" | Terra II
|1983 or earlier
| Clemens & Associates
|
| 
|-
! scope="row" | Third and Goal
| 
| Tactics
| Mark Walton
| 
|-
! scope="row" | Third Foundation
| 
| 
|
|  
|-
! scope="row" | Threat
|Approximately 1995
| 
|
| 
|-
! scope="row" | Throne of Rhianon
|
| Vorpal Games
|
| 
|-
! scope="row" | Third Foundation
|
| Third Foundation
|
| 
|-
! scope="row" | Thunder at Sea
|
| Coconut Council, Inc.
|
| 
|-
! scope="row"  | Thunder Junction
|
|Leisure Time Unlimited
|
|
|-
! scope="row" | Time Chase
|
| Supernova Games
|
| 
|-
! scope="row" | Time Trap
| 
| Flying Buffalo, Inc.
|
| 
|-
! scope="row" | Timelapse
|
|GAD Games
|
|
|-
! scope="row" | The Time Lady
| 
| 
|
| 
|-
! scope="row" | Time Patrol
|
| KTH
|
| 
|-
! scope="row"  | Toadal Chaos - The Frog Wars
|
|Fractal Dimensions
|
|
|-
! scope="row"  | To Be King
|
|REGI
|
|
|-
! scope="row" | Top Ten Football'
|
| Top Twenty Football
|
| 
|-
! scope="row" | Torpedo Boat Duel|
| Tudor Games
|
| 
|-
! scope="row" | Total Conquest|
| 
|
| 
|-
! scope="row" | Tracks|1992
| Friendly Fire Games
|
| 
|-
! scope="row" | Trade & Conquest|
| Frazier Games
|
| 
|-
! scope="row" | Trajan's Treacherous Trap| 1979
| Flying Buffalo
|
| 
|-
! scope="row" | Traveller|
| Applied Gaming Technologies
|
| 
|-
! scope="row"  | Triad|
| Karl Zeimetz
|
| 
|-
! scope="row"  | Triax|
| Galactic Simulations
|
| 
|-
! scope="row" data-sort-value="Tribes of Crane" | The Tribes of Crane| 1976 ("roughly")
| Schubel & Son, Zen Games
|
| 
|-
! scope="row" | Tribe Vibes| 
| Jeff Perkins
|
| 
|-
! scope="row" | Trillion Credit Squadron Campaign| 
| Applied Gaming Technologies Inc.
|
| 
|-
! scope="row" | Tri-Stellar| 
| Battle-Magic Gaming
|
| 
|-
! scope="row" | Troll Quest| 
|Mercury Games
|
| 
|-
! scope="row" | Trolls Bottom| 
|  Dynamic Games
|
| 
|-
! scope="row" | Tunels & Trolls Campaign| 
| Dan Lambert
|
| 
|-
! scope="row" | Twilight: 2000|
|GDW
|
|
|-
! scope="row" | Twilight's Last Gleaming|
| George Franchi
|
| 
|-
! scope="row" | The Ultimate Survival| 
| Steve Sparks
| 
| 
|-
! scope="row" | Ultimate Warrior| 
| Entertainment Plus More, Inc.
| 
| 
|-
! scope="row" | Unexplained| 
| Undying King Games
|
| 
|-
! scope="row" | Universe|
| Clemens and Associates
|
| 
|-
! scope="row" | Universe II|1979
| Clemens and Associates
| Jon Clemens
| 
|-
! scope="row" | Universe III|1980
| Central Texas Computing
| Jon Clemens
| 
|-
! scope="row" | Universe Melting Pot|
| Shrewd Expanse
|
|
|-
! scope="row" | Urban Empire|
| Leisure Time Unlimited
|
| 
|-
! scope="row" | Valacia| 
| Psi-Decay Games
|
|  
|-
! scope="row" | Vampire| 
| Phildee Enterprises
|
|
|-
! scope="row" | Veiled Star|
| Ghetto Games
|
|  
|-
! scope="row" | Venom|
| Game Systems Inc
|
| 
|-
! scope="row" | Vesuvian|
|  
|
|
|-
! scope="row" | VGA Planets|
| Gamer's Den
|
|
|-
! scope="row" | Vietnam| 
| Schubel & Son
|
| 
|-
! scope="row" | Virus|
| R3
|
| 
|-
! scope="row" | Vorcon Wars|
| 
|
| 
|-
! scope="row" | Super Vorcon Wars|
| Vorcon Games
|John Nicholson
| 
|-
! scope="row" | Waddabeekeo|
| 
|
|
|-

! scope="row" | War 1940|
| Schubel & Son
|
| 
|-
! scope="row" | Warboid World|
| Applied Gaming Technologies Inc.
|
| 
|-
! scope="row" | War Council|
| Alternative Dimension Enterprises
|
| 
|-
! scope="row" | Warlands|1987
| Furypost Games
|
| 
|-
! scope="row" | Warlord|
| Phoenix Publications
|
| 
|-
! scope="row" | Warlord of Jarnel|
| JF&L
|
| 
|-
! scope="row" | Warlord of Thunder Crag|
| Creative Management Services
|
|
|-
! scope="row" | Warlords of the Shattered Land| 
| Zephyr Enterprises, Inc.
|
|
|-
! scope="row" | War of 1812| 
| Schubel & Son
|
| 
|-
! scope="row" | War of the Empires| 
| 1960s or 1970s
|
|
|-
! scope="row" | War of Wizards| 
| WOW Games
|
| 
|-
! scope="row" | Warp Force Empires|1987
| Emprise Game Systems
|Steve Gray (Designer/Gamemaster)
| 
|-
! scope="row" | Warp Force One|1980
| Emprise Game Systems
|
| 
|-
! scope="row" | Warriors and Wizards|1992
| Rolling Thunder Games, Inc.
|
| 
|-
! scope="row" | Warriors of the Fractal Domain| 
| Fractal Dimensions
|
| 
|-
! scope="row" | The War to End All Wars| 
| Guild of Blades
|
| 
|-
! scope="row" | Warworld|1985. Ended 1987
| Furypost Games
|
| 
|-
! scope="row" | Wastelands|
| Baron's Regime
|
| 
|-
! scope="row" | Wasteland Warriors|
| War Without Tears
|
| 
|-
! scope="row" | Way of the Warrior|1985. Ended 1987
| Genji Games
|
| 
|-
! scope="row" | WdG Mithra|
| ChoZen FroZen Games
|
| 
|-
! scope="row" | The Weapon| 1984
| Fantastic Simulations, 4 Sight, Verein der Feunde, Harrow Postal Games (UK)
|Danield B. Ealey (Designer)
|  
|-
! scope="row" | Westworld| 1989
| NLT Enterprises
|
| 
|-
! scope="row" | Whodunit| 
| Devil's Advocate Games
|
| 
|-
! scope="row" | Wild Frontiers| 
| Red Talon Gaming
|
| 
|-
! scope="row" | The Wing| 
|  
|
| 
|-
! scope="row" | Winterworld| 
| D. Shulkind
|
| 
|-
! scope="row" | Witch Doctor| 
| Argonaut Publishing
|
| 
|-
! scope="row" | Wizards & Warriors| 
| Eclipse Consulting, Inc.
|
| 
|-
! scope="row" | Wofan| 1980
| The Gamemaster
|Larry G. Hall
| 
|-
! scope="row" | Wolfpack| 
| JF&L
|
|  
|-
! scope="row" | Worldbuilders| 1984
| Worldbuilders
|Marty Kloeden
| 
|-
! scope="row" | World at War| 
| E-Mail Games
|
| 
|-
! scope="row" | World Campaigns| 
| World Campaigns
| 
|
|-
! scope="row" | World Electronic Football League|
|Alpha Simulations
|
|
|-
! scope="row" | World Electronic Hockey League|
|Alpha Simulations
|
|
|-
! scope="row" | World Emperors II| 
| Deltax Gaming
|
| 
|-
! scope="row" | World of Arden| 
| Arden Entertainment
|
| 
|-
! scope="row" | World of Angremar| 1984 or earlier
| The Round Table
|
| 
|-
! scope="row" | World of Chaos|
|GAD Games
|
|
|-
! scope="row" | World of Velgor| To 1985 (then became The Melding)
| Comstar Enterprises
|
|  
|-
! scope="row" | World of Wildon| 
| Randy Gillette
|
|  
|-
! scope="row" | World Conquest|
|Prime Time Simulations
|
|
|-
! scope="row" | World War| 
| The Mailbox
|
| 
|-
! scope="row" | World War 2|
| Miller Systems
|
| 
|-
! scope="row" | World War II: A Second World War Simulation|
| War College Simulations PBM, Inc.
|
| 
|-
! scope="row" | World War IV|
|High Point Games, Pagoda Games (UK), JFH Games, Flying Buffalo Inc.
|
|
|-
! scope="row" | Wyrdworld|
| 
|
| 
|-
! scope="row" | WWII: Open Warfare|
| 
|
| 
|-
! scope="row" | Xenophobe |
| Emprise Game Systems
|
| 
|-
! scope="row" | You Rule!|1989
| Lucky Llama Games
|
| 
|-
! scope="row" | You're an Amoeba, GO!|
| Monastic Software
|
| 
|-
! scope="row" | Zardar|
| 
|
| 
|-
! scope="row" | Zorphwar|Ended 1986
| Zorph Enterprises
|
| 
|-
! scope="row" | Zombie Zone USA| 
| Fax Attack
|
| 
|-
! scope="row" | Zot Madness| 
| Games Without Frontiers
|
|  
|-
|}

 Inactive international play-by-mail games 

{| class="wikitable sortable"
|+List
! scope="col" | Game
! scope="col" | Released 
! scope="col" | Publisher
! scope="col" | Country
! scope="col" class="unsortable" | Notes
|-
! scope="row" | 1066|
| Games Without Frontiers
| UK
|
|-
! scope="row" | 1500 Gold| 
| 
| 
| 
|- 
! scope="row" | 523 Sweet FA|
|Camelot Games 
|UK
|
|-
! scope="row" | Active Fighting Club|
| 
|France
|
|-
! scope="row" | A Day at the Races|
|Dracs Games 
|UK
|
|-
! scope="row" | Absolon Empire| 
| Steve Barker
|Denmark
|
|-
! scope="row" | Absolute Power|
|Jade Enterprises
|UK
|
|-
! scope="row" | Advance Australia Fair|
| 
|AUS
|
|-
! scope="row" | Agamemmnon II|
|Kelem Games 
|UK
|
|-
! scope="row" | Age of Discovery| 
| 
|Canada
|
|-
! scope="row" | Albion|
| Pete Thornhill
| UK
| 
|-
! scope="row" | Alchemist| 
| Seventh Heaven
|UK
|
|-
! scope="row" | Alkimora| 
| 
|
|
|-
! scope="row" | Ancient Empires II| 
| Jason Oates
| UK
|
|- 
! scope="row" | Ancient Empires II| 
| Jason Oates
| UK
| 
|- 
! scope="row" | Android Arena| Circa 1989
| Tertium Games
|UK
| 
|-
! scope="row" | Andromeda Connection| 
|  
| UK
|
|- 
! scope="row" | Anubis Scripts|
| 
|France
| 
|-
! scope="row" | Aqua-ball|
| Jasper Games
|UK
| 
|-
! scope="row" | Aqua Eternam| 1997
| Nick Haynes
|UK
| 
|-
! scope="row" | Ars Regendi|
| 
|German and English
|
|-
! scope="row"  | Apex PBM Soccer|
|Apex Games 
|UK
|
|-
! scope="row" | Aquila| 
| Kevin Johns
| UK
| 
|- 
! scope="row" | Arcadia| Ended 1987
| Jade Games
|UK
|
|-
! scope="row" | Archipel|
| 
|France
| 
|-
! scope="row" | Arya 1325 Campaign| 
| Andrew Walfork
| UK
|
|-
! scope="row"  | Ashes of Empire|
|CSPP 
|Germany
|
|-
! scope="row" | Assyria's End|
|Agema Publications 
|UK
|
|-
! scope="row" | Asteroid Wars| 
| Jason Oates
| UK
| 
|- 
! scope="row" | Astrowars|
|Astraa
|UK
|
|-
! scope="row" | Austerlitz - Der Aufstieg des Adlers|
| 
|German 
| 
|-
! scope="row" | Away the Lads|
|Dracs Games 
|UK
|
|-
! scope="row" | Aztecs|
|Phildee
|UK
|
|-
! scope="row" | Babylon 5 - Le jeu par email|
| 
|France
| 
|-
! scope="row" | Bacteria| 
| Dynamic Games
| Australasia
| 
|-
! scope="row" | Balance of Power
|
| Yellowseed Games of Canada
|Canada
|
|-
! scope="row" | Bakschisch| 
| 
| 
| 
|- 
! scope="row" | Bakufu|
|Dark Wolf Games 
|Ireland, UK
|
|-
! scope="row" | Bananenflanke: Der Fussballmanager|
| 
|German-only
| 
|-
! scope="row" | Barbarians at the Gate|
|Software Simulations 
|UK
|
|-
! scope="row" | Basketball|
|Camelot Games 
|UK
|
|-
! scope="row" | Battlecrabs| 
| Dag Webber, Project Basilisk (UK)
| Germany, UK
|
|-
! scope="row" | Battleground| 
| Jammco
| UK
|  
|-
! scope="row" | Battlequest| 
| Omnipotent Eye
| UK
|
|-
! scope="row" | The Betting Game| 1989
| Temple Games
|UK
|
|-
! scope="row" | Beyond|
|Crasiworld 
|UK
|
|-
! scope="row" | Beyond the Green Sun|
|Sevenstar Games 
|UK
|
|-
! scope="row" | Beyond the Pale| 
| A. L. Butters
| UK
| 
|- 
! scope="row" | Beyond the Waves|
| 
|
|
|-
! scope="row" | Bifrost|
|  
|
| 
|-
! scope="row" | The Biz|1989
| Andrew South
|UK
| 
|-
! scope="row" | Bloodgrace|
| Odd Child Games, New Hope Games
|
| 
|-
! scope="row" | The Boss| 
| Daniel Wood
| UK
| 
|- 
! scope="row" | Calvana| Circa 1989
| Tertium Games
|UK
| 
|-
! scope="row" | Castle Assault|
| Chepro Ltd
|
| 
|-
! scope="row" | The Champions League| 
| Destiny Games
| 
| 
|-
! scope="row" | Chrestonim|
| 
|German-only
| 
|-
! scope="row" | Chronicle| 
|  
| UK
|
|-
! scope="row" | The Chronicles Of The Knights Of Avalon| 
| Jade Games
|UK
|
|-
! scope="row" | Cities of the Dark Elves| 
| Worlds Apart
| UK
|
|-
! scope="row" | Civilisation| 
| PH Games
|  
| 
|- 
! scope="row" | Clans| 
| Warnor Games
| UK
|
|-
! scope="row" | Close Action PBM| 
| Command Authority Games
|UK
|
|-
! scope="row" | The Cluster Rebellion| 1984
| PBM Magazine 
| UK
|
|-
! scope="row" | Coeshaw Postal Football League|
|Mark Coeshaw 
|UK
|
|-
! scope="row" | Come on You Reds|
|Camelot Games 
|UK
|
|-
! scope="row" | Commander – Europe at War|
| 
|France
| 
|-
! scope="row" | Conquests| 
| Daniel Wood
| UK
| 
|- 
! scope="row" | The Contest| 
| White Knight Games
| UK
|  
|-
! scope="row" | Copa Mundial|
| 
|German-only
| 
|-

! scope="row" | Corporate War| 
| State of Mind
| UK
|
|-
! scope="row" | Crack of Doom II| 
| Harlequin Games 
|UK
|
|-
! scope="row" | Crasimoff's Quest World (Crasi-World)
| 
| Crasiworld
|
| 
|-
! scope="row" | Crasimoff's World| 
| Adventures by Mail
|UK
| 
|-
! scope="row" | Creephouse| 
| Project Basilisk
|UK
|
|-
! scope="row" | Crystal Quest|
| HPS Promotions
| UK
|  
|-
! scope="row" | Cyber League| 
| Finoldin Games (French Company)
| UK 
| 
|- 
! scope="row" | Cybernation| 1990
| Ben Warrington, DNA Games
|UK
| 
|-
! scope="row" | Cybertycoon| 
| CME Technologies
|AUS
| 
|-
! scope="row" | Cyborn|
| 
|France
| 
|-
! scope="row" | Dark Age II| 
| Software Simulations 
|UK
|
|-
! scope="row" | Darkfire|
| Nick Stone
| UK
|  
|-
! scope="row" | Dark Pentacle| 1990
| Spleenmangler Games
|UK
|
|-
! scope="row" | DBU - Die Bundesliga|
| 
|German
| 
|-
! scope="row" | Deadzone|
| Jonathan Bell
|UK
| 
|-
! scope="row" | Deathblade|
|  
|  
|  
|-
! scope="row" | Decision in the East| 
|  D. Roberts
|  UK
| 
|- 
! scope="row" | The Derby| Circa 1989
| Camelot Games
|UK
|
|-
! scope="row" | Démange – Le Jeu|
| 
|France
| 
|-
! scope="row" | Demon| 
| Shardar Games
| UK
|
|-
! scope="row" | Der Supermanager|
| 
|German
| 
|-
! scope="row" | Diadochi| 
| Cyclops PBM 
|UK
|
|-
! scope="row" | Directive 32| 
| Richard Cozens 
|UK
|
|-
! scope="row" | Dogfight| Circa 1989
| Dark Mask Games
| UK
| 
|-
! scope="row" | Dogfight! Battle for the Skies!| 
| Rampage Games PBM
|UK
|
|-
! scope="row" | The Dominant Power|
| Creative Gaming
|
| 
|-
! scope="row" | Doomsphere| 
| Games Unlimited
|UK
|
|-
! scope="row" | Downfall (Diplomacy Variant)
|
| Games Without Frontiers
| UK
| 
|-
! scope="row" | Diplomacy Ludomaniac| 
|  
|Germany
|
|-
! scope="row" | Dragonhelm| 
| Ulaidh Games 
|UK
|
|-
! scope="row" | Dreamscape| 
| Robin Seamer
| UK
| 
|- 
! scope="row" | DungeonWorld|
| Madhouse 
|UK
| 
|-
! scope="row" | DW RPG| 
| Daniel Wood
| UK
| 
|- 
! scope="row" | Dwarf Falls| 
| 
|Canada
|
|-
! scope="row" | Eagle| 
| Sabre Games 
|UK
|
|-
! scope="row" | Eagle, Falcon, Gryphon and Mundis| 
| Games Design Corporation
|UK
|
|-
! scope="row" | Eastern Temples| 
| Finoldin Games (French Company)
| UK 
| 
|- 
! scope="row" | Einstein's Lot| 
| Ulaidh Games 
|Ireland, UK
| 
|-
! scope="row" | Emperor| 
| East Empire Games
|UK
|
|-
! scope="row" | Empires of Corinium| 
|  
| UK
| 
|-
! scope="row" | En Garde! Banana (PBEM)
| 
| 
| UK
| 
|-
! scope="row" | En Garde!: Briny| 
|  Briny En Garde! (Terry Cooke) 
|UK
| 
|-
! scope="row" | En Garde! Dieu et Mon Droi| 
| Timewyrm
| UK
| 
|-
! scope="row" | En Garde!: King & Cardinal| 
| Ian Coleman 
|UK
| 
|-
! scope="row" | En Garde!: LPBS| 
| Paul Evans 
|UK
| 
|-
! scope="row" | En Garde!: Sage En Garde!| 
| Sage En Garde
|UK
|
|-
! scope="row" | En Garde! Small Furry Undergrads (SFUG)| 
| Small Furry Creatures Press
| UK
|
|-
! scope="row" | En Garde! The Sun King| 
| Nigel Mission
| UK
| 
|-
! scope="row" | Empires| 
| Software Simulations 
|UK
| 
|-
! scope="row" | Endgame| 
| Harlequin
| UK
|
|- 
! scope="row" | Endless Time and Space| 
| Sabre Games 
|UK
| 
|-
! scope="row" | Epic| 1989
| KJC Games
|UK
|
|-
! scope="row" | Epoch of Might| 
| Dark Wolf Games 
|Ireland, UK
|
|-
! scope="row" | Espionage|
| Sage Systems
|
|  
|-
! scope="row" | Ether| 
| Tingols Games 
| UK
|
|-
! scope="row" | Europa| 
| Timewyrm
| UK
|
|- 
! scope="row" | Euro Soccer Boss| 
| Derek Doran
| UK
|  
|-
! scope="row" | Evolution of the Stars| 
| Verein der Feunde 
|Germany
|
|-
! scope="row" | Explorers of Orion| 
| 
|
| 
|-
! scope="row" | Extra Time-Chairman| 
| KJC Games 
|UK
|
|-
! scope="row" | Extra Time-original| 
| KJC Games/Crasiworld 
|UK
| 
|-
! scope="row" | Faceplant|Circa 1989
| Endeavour Fantasy Games
|UK
|  Skating game. 
|-
! scope="row" | Falcon| 
| Sabre Games 
|UK
|
|-
! scope="row" | F.A.M.E. (Force and Magic Entwined)
| 
| T.J. Drew
|UK
| 
|-
! scope="row" | Fantasy Soccer| 
| KJC Games 
|UK
|
|-
! scope="row" | Fantasya - Welt des Traumes|
| 
|German
| 
|-
! scope="row" | Fibonacci| 
| 
| 
| 
|- 
! scope="row" | First Crusade| 
| Kelem Games 
|UK
| 
|-
! scope="row" | Food Chain| 
| Phildee Enterprises
| UK
|
|-
! scope="row" | Football Predictions| 
| Dracs Games 
|UK
| 
|-
! scope="row" | Footballisto|
| 
|France
| 
|-
! scope="row" | For God, King & Country| 
| Agema Publications 
|UK
| 
|-
! scope="row" | Formula One Champion|
| Steve Evans
|UK
| 
|-

! scope="row" | Fortunes of War|
| Webwars Continuum
| Canada
| 
|-
! scope="row" | Freedom PBM Soccer| 
| Freedom PBM Soccer
| UK
|
|-
! scope="row" | From out of Aeons Gone| 
| Silver Dreamer
| UK
|
|-
! scope="row" | From the Mouth of Hell|
| 
|
| 
|-
! scope="row" | Further Into Fantasy| 
| The Games Laboratory
|UK
| 
|-
! scope="row" | Fussball-Liga| 
| 
|Germany
|
|-
! scope="row" | Gameplan| 
| Software Simulations/Danny McConnell, Ab Initio Games 
|UK
|
|-
! scope="row" | Gameplan Baseball| 
| Danny McConnell, Ab Initio Games 
|UK
| 
|-
! scope="row" | Gameplan Boxing| 
| Danny McConnell, Ab Initio Games 
|UK
|
|-
! scope="row" | Gameplan: Advanced| 
| Software Simulations/Danny McConnell, Ab Initio Games
|UK
|
|-
! scope="row" | Gang City|
|Athena's Avatar (AUS licensee)
|Canada, Australia
|
|-
! scope="row" | Ghostbusters|
| Temple Games
|
|
|-
! scope="row" | Gladiatoria|
| 
|France
| 
|-
! scope="row" | Gladiator School| Circa 1989
| Camelot Games
|UK
| 
|-
! scope="row" | Globemaster| Circa 1989
| Time Patterns
|UK
| 
|-
! scope="row" | Gloire et Pouvoir|
| 
|France
| 
|-
! scope="row" | The Glory of Kings|
|Agema Publications 
|UK
|
|-
! scope="row" | Glory Seekers| 
| Parlos Games
| UK
|
|- 
! scope="row" | Gormants| 
| 
|New Zealand
|
|-
! scope="row" | Grand National| 
| Camelot Games 
|UK
| 
|-
! scope="row" | The Great Detective|
| Creative Encounters
|
| 
|-
! scope="row" | Green Sun| 
| Seven Star Games
| UK
|
|-
! scope="row" | Grid Bowl|
| 
|
| 
|-
! scope="row" | Gridstats| 
|  
| UK
| 
|-
! scope="row" | Grid Wars| 
| Games Design Corporation
|UK
| 
|-
! scope="row" | Gryphon| 
| Sabre Games 
|UK
| 
|-
! scope="row" | Gladivs et Pilvm| 
| The PBM Express
| UK
|
|-
! scope="row" | Gothick| 1989
| Temple Games
|UK
|
|-
! scope="row" | Gunboat Diplomacy| 
| Agema Publications 
|UK
|
|-
! scope="row" | Hattrick|
| 
|France
| 
|-
! scope="row" | Haunted Manor| 
| Madhouse 
|UK
| 
|-
! scope="row" | Heavens Above| 
| Fuel PBM 
|UK
|
|-
! scope="row" | Heldenwelt (Heroes world)
| 
| SSV Klapf-Bachler OEG 
|Austria
|
|-
! scope="row" | Heroes of Olynthus| 
| Timewyrm 
|UK
| 
|-
! scope="row" | Heroville|
| 
|France
| 
|-
! scope="row" | Homebase Alpha| 
| The Games Laboratory with WOZ Games
|UK
| 
|-
! scope="row" | Homeworld| 
| 
|New Zealand
|
|-
! scope="row" | Horgoroth: Gateway to Undagala|
| Quillian Enterprises
|
| 
|-
! scope="row" | Horizons End|
| Schubel & Son
|
| 
|-
! scope="row" | Horses For Courses| 
| Spellbinder Games
| UK
| 
|- 
! scope="row" | Houseworld II| 
| 
|New Zealand
|
|-
! scope="row" | Imperial Honorarium| 
| Ragtime Leisure
| UK
|
|- 
! scope="row" | Influences|
| 
|France
| 
|-
! scope="row" | In Off the Post| 
| In Off the Post 
|UK
| 
|-
! scope="row" | In the House Today| 
| Sabre Games 
|UK
|
|-
! scope="row" | Invasion| Circa 1989
| GAD Games
|UK
| 
|-
! scope="row" | Island of the Gobin King| 
| Goblin Games
| UK
|
|- 
! scope="row" | It's in the Net| 
| Chris Wright 
|UK
| 
|-
! scope="row" | Jack Duckworth’s Alternate Universe| 
| Simon Ives
| UK
| 
|- 
! scope="row" | Jetball| 
| Alchemist's Guild
|UK
| 
|-
! scope="row" | Jumbo Crisis| Circa 1989
| MAG
| UK
|  
|-
! scope="row" | JWA Wrestling| 
| Richard Fryer 
|UK
|
|-
! scope="row" | Kalevala|
| 
|German
| 
|-
! scope="row" | Keys of Bled | 
| Spellbinder Games
|UK
| 
|-
! scope="row" | Keys of Medohk| 
| Infinite Game Design Studio, licensed to Phildee Enterprises (UK), and Dynamic Games (US)
|Australasia only in 1996, also UK, US
| 
|-
! scope="row" | Kingdoms of Vengance| 
|  
| UK
| 
|-
! scope="row" | Kings of Steel| 
| Stephen R. White
|UK
|
|-
! scope="row" | Klall-Karvv: Prison of the Elementals| 
| Seventh Heaven
|UK
|
|-
! scope="row" | Knights of Christendom| 
| Sabre Games 
|UK
| 
|-
! scope="row" | Kontos| 
| Battle Cry Play-by-Mail
|UK
|
|-
! scope="row" | Kosmor – Forces of the Galaxies|
| 
|German
| 
|-
! scope="row" | Ksar Exo| 
| Terre de Jeux 
|France
| 
|-
! scope="row" | La Glorie du Roi| 
| Agema Publications 
|UK
| 
|-
! scope="row" | The Lands of Ghamaxtri| 
| WHC
|  
| 
|-
! scope="row" | La Ultima Cruzada| 
| Sabre Games 
|UK
|
|-
! scope="row" | Land of Legend| 
| Echelon 1
|UK
|
|-
! scope="row" | Lands of Elvaria| 1989
| Mark Pinder 
|UK
|
|-
! scope="row" | Lanista| 
|  
|UK
|
|-
! scope="row" | League Soccer| 1986
| Necrom Games
| UK
| 
|-
! scope="row" | Legacy of the Panther| 
| West Penne Games
|UK
|
|-
! scope="row" | Legacy of Val-Hadahd| 
|  
| UK
| 
|-
! scope="row" | Legend of the Stars|
| Adrian Bagley
|
|  
|-
! scope="row" | Legends of Israa| 
| Viking Games 
|UK
|
|-
! scope="row" | Le Nécromant|
| 
|France
| 
|-
! scope="row" | Les Petites Betes Soyeuses| 1986
| The Ninth Legion 
|UK
|
|-
! scope="row" | Lizards| 
| The Ninth Legion 
|UK
| 
|-
! scope="row" | Logan's Run|
| Sage Systems
|
| 
|-
! scope="row" | Lords of Morkar|
| Spellbinder Games
|
|  
|-
! scope="row" | Lore Lords of Britain|
| Lore Games Limited
|
| 
|-
! scope="row" | Loremasters of Corlean| Circa 1989
| Reality Shift Games
|UK
|
|-
! scope="row" | LTWars|
| Spellbinder Games
|
| 
|-
! scope="row" | Lurkans & Durkans|
| Island Light & Magick
|
| 
|-
! scope="row" | L'univers du Flow|
| 
|France
| 
|-
! scope="row" | Matrix Hockey|
| 
|France
| 
|-
! scope="row" | Machiavellian| 
| Seventh Heaven
|UK
|
|-
! scope="row" | Macedon| 
| Alchemist's Guild
|UK
|
|-
! scope="row" | Mageborn|
| DFS Productions
|
| 
|-
! scope="row" | Magelords Of Dorm| 
| Project Basilisk
|UK
| 
|-
! scope="row" | Magic Cards| 
| Madhouse
| UK
| 
|-
! scope="row" | Maim, Mutilate & Murder|
| Island Light & Magick
|
| 
|-
! scope="row" | MCMII| 
|  
| UK
| 
|-
! scope="row" | Megalomania| 
| M.A.G., Odde Fellows and Co. (licensed to GAD Games)
| UK
|  
|-
! scope="row" | Men in Black| 
|  
| UK
| 
|-
! scope="row" | Middle-Earth PBM Third Age| 
| Strategic Fantasy Games of Australia
|
| 
|-
! scope="row" | Midhir| 
| Timewyrm
| UK
|
|-
! scope="row" | Midhir: Cities of Olynthus| 
| Timewyrm
| UK
|
|- 
! scope="row" | Midhir: Realms of Israa| 
| Timewyrm (Andrew Fulara)
| UK
| 
|- 
! scope="row" | Mighty Heroes| 
| Received Wisdom 
|UK
| 
|-
! scope="row" | Millenium| 
| 
|Spain
|
|-
! scope="row" | The Millenium Effect| 1997
| Steve Barker
|UK
| 
|-
! scope="row" | Mithra| 
| Wolfgang Roefke
| Germany
|
|- 
! scope="row" | Morchael| 
| Daniel Wright
| UK
| 
|- 
! scope="row" | Morne Plane| 
|  
|France
|
|-
! scope="row" | Mortal Fighters| 
| Allsorts
| UK
| 
|- 
! scope="row" | Mortis Maximus| 
| Madhouse 6 
|UK
| 
|-
! scope="row" | Movie Mogul| 
| Movie Mogul
|UK
| 
|-
! scope="row" | Multiplex| 
| ESC
|UK
| 
|-
! scope="row" | Mundis| 
| Sabre Games 
|UK
| 
|-
! scope="row" | Napoleonic Battles| 
| Agema Publications
|UK
| 
|-
! scope="row" | NBL Aussie Basketball| 
| Norman
|AUS
| 
|-
! scope="row" | Necromancer| 
| Madhouse 6 
|UK
| 
|- 
! scope="row" | Nemak 2| 
|  
|France
| 
|-
! scope="row" | Neutral Zone| 
| Neutral Zone 
|UK
| 
|-
! scope="row" | New Earth| 
|  
| UK
| 
|-
! scope="row" | Night of the Things| 
| Madhouse
| UK
|
|-
! scope="row" | No Holds Barred| 
| Laughing Dog 
|UK
| 
|-
! scope="row" | Nomads of Urth| 
| 
|UK
| 
|-
! scope="row" | Nutgrabbers| 
| Comatose Games
|
| 
|-
! scope="row" | Nuke!| 
| 
|New Zealand
|
|-
! scope="row" | Of Steam and Ether| 
| GRLA Reaper Design
|UK
|
|-
! scope="row" | Omega Squad| 
|  
|UK
| 
|-
! scope="row" | Orion's Finger| 
| 
|
| 
|-
! scope="row" | Orks| 
|  
|Sweden
| 
|-
! scope="row" | Outbound| 
| 
|UK
|
|-
! scope="row" | Outlaw|Ended 1989
| Warren Saul
| UK
|  
|-
! scope="row" | Ovalie|
| 
|France
| 
|-
! scope="row" | Overlord| 
| State of Mind Games 
|UK
| 
|-
! scope="row" | PAFL| 
|  
| UK
| 
|-
! scope="row" | Paloma Football Management| 
| Simon Courcha
| UK
|
|- 
! scope="row" | The Paloma League| 
| Justin Shore 
|UK
| 
|-
! scope="row" | Panzergruppe II| 
| Agema Publications 
|UK
| 
|-
! scope="row" | Parade|
| Nick Stone
| UK
|  
|-
! scope="row" | Paraglyphics - The Challenge of the Magus|
| Chepro Ltd
|
| 
|-
! scope="row" | Pathocrom|
| Innovative Games
| 
| 
|-
! scope="row" | Peril II|
| K + C Enterprises
|
|  
|-
! scope="row" | Phantasmech| 
| Crasiworld 
|UK
| 
|-
! scope="row" | Phoenix Rising| 
| Phildee Enterprises
| UK
|
|-
! scope="row" | Planet Soccer| 
| David Scriven 
|UK
| 
|-
! scope="row" | Planetary Wrestling Syndicate| 
| Thomas Lancaster 
|UK
| 
|-
! scope="row" | Play On| 
| Danny McConnel, Ab Initio Games 
|UK
| 
|-
! scope="row" | Pop Star| 1989
| Dan McCrossan, Ideal Games
| UK
|{{|Players tried to become a successful pop star. Computer moderated, 14-day turnaround.}}
|-
! scope="row" | Portals and Palaces| 
| Adam Hollindale 
|UK
| 
|-
! scope="row" | The Power of Money| 
| Daydream
|Germany
|
|-
! scope="row" | Premier League| 
|  
|UK
| 
|-
! scope="row" | Premier Management Football| 
|  Premier Management 
|UK
| 
|-
! scope="row" | Premier Master Soccer|
| Paul King
| UK
|  
|-
! scope="row" | Primvs Inter Pares| 
|  Interesting Times 
|UK
| 
|-
! scope="row" | Pro Soccer| 
| Olympia Games 
|UK
| 
|-
! scope="row" | Prometheus| 
| Hunky Monkey Games
|UK
| 
|-
! scope="row" | Pub Kickin'| 
| Camelot Games 
|UK
| 
|-
! scope="row" | Pure Fantasy Ftbll| 
| Pure Fantasy Games 
|UK
| 
|-
! scope="row" | Pyraglyphics| 1989
| Chepro
|UK
|
|-
! scope="row" | Quest|
|Adventures By Mail, KJC Games 
|UK
| 
|-
! scope="row" | Quixo| 
| 
| 
| 
|- 
! scope="row" | Raceplan Grand Prix| 
| Danny McConnell, Ab Initio Games 
|UK
| 
|-
! scope="row" | Raiders Of Gwaras| Prior to 1989 
| MJR Games
|UK
|
|-
! scope="row" | Railway Rivals| 
|  
|  
| 
|- 
! scope="row" | Ranch Wars| 1989
| Micro-Genesis
|UK
|
|-
! scope="row" | Rat Racing| Circa 1989
| Darren Cook, GAD Games
|UK
| 
|-
! scope="row" | Reality Racing| 
| Camelot Games 
|UK
| 
|-
! scope="row" | Realms of Israa| 
| Viking Games 
|UK
| 
|-
! scope="row" | Realms of Lothmil| 
| Timewyrm
| UK
| 
|- 
! scope="row" | Realm of The Priest| 
| C.M.A.D.
| UK
|
|- 
! scope="row" | Reorx| 1989
| Earlsdene Enterprises
| UK
| 
|-
! scope="row" | Revenge Of The Many Legged Man Eating Mutant Tiger Hounds From Outer Space| 
| Alchemist's Guild
|UK
| 
|-
! scope="row" | Reversi V3.4|
| 
|France
| 
|-
! scope="row" | Riddle of the Sands| 
| Silver Dreamer 
|UK
| 
|-
! scope="row" | Royal Alliances| 
| Finoldin Games (French Company)
| UK 
| 
|- 
! scope="row" | Rugby League Breakout| 
| Danny McConnell, Ab Initio Games 
|UK
| 
|-
! scope="row" | Rugby League Challenge| 
| Camelot Games 
|UK
|  
|-
! scope="row" | Rugby League Stats| 
| Danny McConnell, Ab Initio Games 
|UK
| 
|-
! scope="row" | Rugby Union Stats| 
| Danny McConnell, Ab Initio Games 
|UK
| 
|-
! scope="row" | Ruler of the Galactic Web: Dragonspire| 
| Software Simulations 
|AUS
| 
|-
! scope="row" | Run Chase| 
| Software Simulations 
|UK
| 
|-
! scope="row" | S/F| 
| Received Wisdom 
|UK
| 
|-
! scope="row" | Saturnalia: Exile| 
| Harlequin Games 
|UK
| 
|-
! scope="row" | Saturnalia: NE| 
| Dark Wolf Games 
|Northern Ireland, UK
| 
|-
! scope="row" | Saturnalia: NW| 
| Mark Williams 
|UK
| 
|-
! scope="row" | Saturnalia: S| 
| Mike Absolom 
|UK
| 
|-
! scope="row" | Saturnalia: Serpent Isles| 
| Ashley Casey 
|UK
| 
|-
! scope="row" | Saturnalia: Veridian Isles| 
| Dark Wolf Games 
|Northern Ireland, UK
| 
|-
! scope="row" | Save Our Souls|
| Dave Hughes
|UK
|
|-
! scope="row" | Schwertreiter|
| 
|German-only
| 
|-
! scope="row" | Scottish Email Soccer League| 
| SESL, Mark Creasy 
|UK
| 
|-
! scope="row" | Seadogs and Darlings| 
| Seadogs and Darlings 
|UK
| 
|-
! scope="row" | Sector Five| 
| Pterra Games
|UK
|
|-
! scope="row" | Seige| 
| Vorcon Wars
|UK
|
|-
! scope="row" | Serim Ral| 
| Thomas Harlan 
|UK
| 
|-
! scope="row" | Serim Ral| 
| Incubus Designs 
|UK
| 
|-
! scope="row" | Shadowlords II| 
| Post-It Games
| Australasia
|  
|-
! scope="row" | Shambhala| 
| Wayne (Shambhala) 
|UK
| 
|-
! scope="row" | Shattered World|  
| Jade Games
|
|
|-
! scope="row" | Siege| Circa 1989
| Vorcon Games
|UK
|
|-
! scope="row" | Skullball| 
| On the Brink
|UK
|
|-
! scope="row" | Slamdunk| 
| Danny McConnell, Ab Initio Games 
|UK
| 
|-
! scope="row" | Slapshot| 
| Danny McConnell, Ab Initio Games 
|UK
|
|-
! scope="row" | Slapshot| 1989
| Mark Walton, Tactics
| UK
| Ice hockey simulation.
|-
! scope="row" | The S-League| 
| Sporting Dreams 
|UK
| 
|-
! scope="row" | Soccer Boss| 1989
| Dan McCrossan, Ideal Games
| UK
| Simple football management
|-
! scope="row" | Soccer Challenge| 
| Mark Palin
| UK
|
|-
! scope="row" | Soccer Manager| 
| Chris Robey 
|UK
| 
|-
! scope="row" | Soccer Sevens| 
| Robin Seamer 
|UK
| 
|-
! scope="row" | Soccer Six| Circa 1989
| Camelot Games
|UK
| 
|-
! scope="row" | Soccer Star| 
| Trident Games
|UK
| 
|-
! scope="row" | Soccer Stats| 
| Jason Oates 
|UK
| 
|-
! scope="row" | Soccer Strategy| 
| Software Simulations 
|UK
| 
|-
! scope="row" | Soccergame.de - Fussball Pbem|
| 
|German
| 
|-
! scope="row" | Soccer-Six| 
| Camelot Games 
|UK
| 
|-
! scope="row" | Sopwith|
|Richard Morris
|UK
|
|-
! scope="row" | Space Troopers| 
| KJC Games 
|UK
| 
|-
! scope="row" | Space Plan| 
| Software Simulations 
|UK
| 
|-
! scope="row" | Speculate| 
| Software Simulations 
|UK
| 
|-
! scope="row" | Splat the Galaxy| 
| 
| UK
|
|-
! scope="row" | Sport of Kings| 
|  
|  
|
|- 
! scope="row" | Squad Leader| 
| Richard Miles
|UK
| 
|-
! scope="row" | SSFA| 
| Chris Baylis 
|UK
| 
|-
! scope="row" | Star Empires 2| 
|  
|UK
| 
|-
! scope="row" | Star Empires IV| 
| Geoff Squibb 
|UK
| 
|-
! scope="row" | Star Flaws|
| Island Light & Magick
|
| 
|-
! scope="row" | Starfleet Warlord| 
| Pagoda Games 
|UK
| 
|-
! scope="row" | Starglobe| Circa 1984
| Time Patterns
|UK
| 
|-
! scope="row" | Starglobe+| 
| Timepatterns PBM Games
| UK
|
|-
! scope="row" | Starglobe 3|
| 
|
| 
|-
! scope="row" | Starhawk|
| Sage Systems
|
|  
|-
! scope="row" | Starmagic III| 1989
| Whitegold Games
|UK
| 
|-
! scope="row" | StarQuest| 
| Harlequin Games 
|UK
| 
|-
! scope="row" | Stars!| 
| Empire
| UK
|
|-
! scope="row" | Star Tactics – La Saga des Etoile|
| 
|France
| 
|-
! scope="row" | Star Wars Empire - Officiers de l'Empire|
| 
|France
| 
|-
! scope="row" | Sternenhimmel| 
| 
| 
| 
|- 
! scope="row" | Sticks & Stones| 
| Saul D. Betesh Co.
| Canada
| 
|-
! scope="row" | Stockbroker|
| Games Without Frontiers
| UK
| 
|-
! scope="row" | Streets of Blood| 
| Raider Leisure
| UK
|  
|-
! scope="row" | Streetwise| 
| The Games Laboratory with WOZ Games
|UK
| 
|-
! scope="row" | St. Vals II|
| Rampage Games
|
| 
|-
! scope="row" | Subterrania| 1990
|UK
|Timepattern Games
|
|-
! scope="row" | Summit Soccer League| 
| Summit Soccer League 
|UK
| 
|-
! scope="row" | Super Vorcon Wars| Circa 1989
| Vorcon Games
|UK
|
|-
! scope="row" | St. Valentine's Day Massacre| Circa 1989
| Rampage Games
| UK
|  
|-
! scope="row" | St. Valentine's II| Circa 1989
| Rampage Games
| UK
|  
|-
! scope="row" | Symmachia| 
|  
|France
|
|-
! scope="row" | Szenario| 
|  
| UK
| 
|- 
! scope="row" | Tartarus| 
| Faraway Games 
|UK
| 
|-
! scope="row" | Tatanka| 
| Terre de Jeux 
|France
|
|-
! scope="row" | Team Balance| 
| Martin Burrows 
|UK
| 
|-
! scope="row" | Ten to Three| 
| J. Foster, Ten to Three 
|UK
| 
|-
! scope="row" | Tennis JPEM|
| 
|France
| 
|-
! scope="row" | Terran III  
|1983
| Games Without Frontiers
| UK
| 
|-
! scope="row" | Tharnak|
| 
|German
| 
|-
! scope="row" | Thaura| 
| 
|Canada
|
|-
! scope="row" | Throne of Cofain| 
| Morton Larsen 
|UK
| 
|-
! scope="row" | Timelapse| 
| 
|UK
| 
|-
! scope="row" | Timepilot|
| Galactic Society Four
|
| 
|-
! scope="row" | The Time Sentinel| 
| Vorcon Games
|UK
|
|-
! scope="row" | Torrausch|
| 
|German-only
| 
|-
! scope="row" | Total Conquest| 
|  
|Europe
| 
|-
! scope="row" | Tough at the Top| 
| Games By Mail 
|UK
| 
|-
! scope="row" | TourmanageR - DAS Radsport-Pbem|
| 
|German
| 
|-
! scope="row" | Trangrad| 
| STS Games 
|Germany
|
|-
! scope="row" | Trolls Bottom| 1989
| KJC Games (UK)
|Sweden, UK
|
|-
! scope="row" | Tyvanah| 
| 
| 
|
|- 
! scope="row" | Ultimate Rugby| 
| Ultra Sports 
|UK
| 
|-
! scope="row" | Ultimate Test| 
| Simon Williams 
|UK
| 
|-
! scope="row" | Ultraball 2100|
| 
|France
| 
|-
! scope="row" | Ultra Cricket| 
| Ultra Sports 
|UK
| 
|-
! scope="row" | Ultra Tennis| 
| Ultra Sports 
|UK
| 
|-
! scope="row" | Under Different Suns| 
|  
|UK
| 
|-
! scope="row" | Unquiet Slumbers| 
|  
| UK
| 
|-
! scope="row" | Valhalla| 
| Mandrake PBM
| UK
|
|- 
! scope="row" | Vecta|
| Mark Wightman
|
| 
|-
! scope="row" | Vendetta| 
| Agema Publications
| UK
| 
|- 
! scope="row" | Viking Saga| 
| Viking Saga 
|UK
| 
|-
! scope="row" | Vitriol| 
| Received Wisdom 
|UK
| 
|-
! scope="row" | The Wall Game|
| Nick Stone
| UK
|  
|-
! scope="row" | War of the Dark God| 
| Morton Larsen 
|UK
| 
|-
! scope="row" | Warlord| 
| KJC Games 
|UK
| 
|-
! scope="row" | Warm Up| 
| Finoldin Games (French Company)
| UK 
| 
|- 
! scope="row" | Warst★r (Warstar)
| 
| Interesting Times
| UK
|
|- 
! scope="row" | Where Lies the Power| 
|
|
| 
|-
! scope="row" | Wild World Web| 
| Received Wisdom 
|UK
| 
|-
! scope="row" | Winning Post| 
|Adrian Glover 
|UK
| 
|-
! scope="row" | World Conquest| 1988
| Prime Time Simulations, SSV Klapf-Bachler OEG 
| Germany
|   
|-
! scope="row" | World Fictional Wrestling| 
| Chris Bury, World Fictional Wrestling 
|UK
| 
|-
! scope="row" | World of Chaos| Mid-1980s
| GAD Games
|UK
| 
|-
! scope="row" | World of Denagda| Circa 1996
| Black Pyramid Games
|UK
| 
|-
! scope="row" | World of Vengeance| 
| 
|
| 
|-
! scope="row" | World War I Battles| 
| Agema Publications 
|UK
| 
|-
! scope="row" | Worlds Apart| 
| Colin Andrews 
|UK
| 
|-
! scope="row" | World Domination (Diplomacy Variant)
|
| Games Without Frontiers
| UK
| 
|-
! scope="row" | Wottascore| 
| Camelot Games 
|UK
| 
|-
! scope="row" | WOW| 
|Russell Smith 
|UK
| 
|-
! scope="row" | WW IV Blitz| 
| Pagoda Games 
|UK
| 
|-
! scope="row" | WW IV H2H| 
| Pagoda Games 
|UK
| 
|-
! scope="row" | Xanoth| Circa 1989
| Manifestation Games
| UK
| 
|-
! scope="row" | Xarian Adventures| 
| True North Gaming
| Canada
| 
|-
! scope="row" | Xott| 
| Antony Dunks 
|UK
| 
|-
! scope="row" | Xott Solo| 
| Antony Dunks 
|UK
| 
|-
! scope="row" | Zylok Wars| 
| Destiny Games
| 
|
|-
|}

Notes

 References 

 Selected sources 
 1st Class: The Play By Mail Games Magazine American Gamer magazine (July–August 1990). No. 1. 
 
 Computer Gamer magazine. Various issues.
 Computer Games International Crash magazine. Various issues.
 D2 Report. Various issues.
 Different Worlds magazine
 Dragon magazine. 
 Flagship magazine. Various issues.
 Games International Gaming Universal magazine. Various issues.
 GM Magazine. Various issues. 
 Journal of the PBM Gamer. Various editions.
 Paper Mayhem magazine. Various issues.
 PBMZine. Various issues.
 Shadis magazine. Various issues.
  Space Gamer/Fantasy Gamer magazine. Various issues. 
 Suspense & Decision magazine. Various issues.
 The Games Machine White Wolf'' magazine. Various issues.

External links 
  A list of 362 PBM companies, past and present, many of which are now out of business.
  A compilation of PBM games by publisher in list form as of 2011.
  A comprehensive, searchable compilation of PBM games. 
  A list of active PBM games as of July 2021.

 List
Play-by-mail